

318001–318100 

|-bgcolor=#fefefe
| 318001 ||  || — || February 12, 2004 || Palomar || NEAT || H || align=right data-sort-value="0.96" | 960 m || 
|-id=002 bgcolor=#E9E9E9
| 318002 ||  || — || February 9, 2004 || Palomar || NEAT || — || align=right | 1.2 km || 
|-id=003 bgcolor=#fefefe
| 318003 ||  || — || February 14, 2004 || Kitt Peak || Spacewatch || H || align=right data-sort-value="0.83" | 830 m || 
|-id=004 bgcolor=#E9E9E9
| 318004 ||  || — || February 11, 2004 || Palomar || NEAT || RAF || align=right | 1.3 km || 
|-id=005 bgcolor=#d6d6d6
| 318005 ||  || — || February 10, 2004 || Palomar || NEAT || — || align=right | 4.3 km || 
|-id=006 bgcolor=#fefefe
| 318006 ||  || — || February 11, 2004 || Palomar || NEAT || — || align=right | 1.5 km || 
|-id=007 bgcolor=#fefefe
| 318007 ||  || — || February 11, 2004 || Palomar || NEAT || NYS || align=right data-sort-value="0.77" | 770 m || 
|-id=008 bgcolor=#d6d6d6
| 318008 ||  || — || February 12, 2004 || Kitt Peak || Spacewatch || 3:2 || align=right | 5.2 km || 
|-id=009 bgcolor=#d6d6d6
| 318009 ||  || — || February 14, 2004 || Palomar || NEAT || HIL3:2 || align=right | 8.0 km || 
|-id=010 bgcolor=#fefefe
| 318010 ||  || — || February 15, 2004 || Socorro || LINEAR || H || align=right data-sort-value="0.94" | 940 m || 
|-id=011 bgcolor=#d6d6d6
| 318011 ||  || — || February 15, 2004 || Catalina || CSS || 3:2 || align=right | 6.1 km || 
|-id=012 bgcolor=#fefefe
| 318012 ||  || — || February 11, 2004 || Anderson Mesa || LONEOS || H || align=right data-sort-value="0.77" | 770 m || 
|-id=013 bgcolor=#E9E9E9
| 318013 ||  || — || February 11, 2004 || Kitt Peak || Spacewatch || — || align=right data-sort-value="0.95" | 950 m || 
|-id=014 bgcolor=#d6d6d6
| 318014 ||  || — || February 19, 2004 || Haleakala || NEAT || HIL3:2 || align=right | 8.3 km || 
|-id=015 bgcolor=#fefefe
| 318015 ||  || — || February 16, 2004 || Socorro || LINEAR || H || align=right data-sort-value="0.86" | 860 m || 
|-id=016 bgcolor=#E9E9E9
| 318016 ||  || — || February 18, 2004 || Catalina || CSS || EUN || align=right | 1.4 km || 
|-id=017 bgcolor=#fefefe
| 318017 ||  || — || February 16, 2004 || Kitt Peak || Spacewatch || — || align=right | 1.2 km || 
|-id=018 bgcolor=#E9E9E9
| 318018 ||  || — || February 18, 2004 || Catalina || CSS || EUN || align=right | 1.5 km || 
|-id=019 bgcolor=#fefefe
| 318019 ||  || — || February 18, 2004 || Socorro || LINEAR || H || align=right data-sort-value="0.68" | 680 m || 
|-id=020 bgcolor=#E9E9E9
| 318020 ||  || — || February 16, 2004 || Socorro || LINEAR || — || align=right data-sort-value="0.99" | 990 m || 
|-id=021 bgcolor=#fefefe
| 318021 ||  || — || February 29, 2004 || Kitt Peak || Spacewatch || CLA || align=right | 1.8 km || 
|-id=022 bgcolor=#E9E9E9
| 318022 ||  || — || February 26, 2004 || Kitt Peak || M. W. Buie || MAR || align=right | 1.3 km || 
|-id=023 bgcolor=#E9E9E9
| 318023 ||  || — || March 11, 2004 || Palomar || NEAT || — || align=right | 1.7 km || 
|-id=024 bgcolor=#d6d6d6
| 318024 ||  || — || March 12, 2004 || Palomar || NEAT || VER || align=right | 3.7 km || 
|-id=025 bgcolor=#E9E9E9
| 318025 ||  || — || March 12, 2004 || Palomar || NEAT || MAR || align=right | 1.8 km || 
|-id=026 bgcolor=#E9E9E9
| 318026 ||  || — || March 11, 2004 || Palomar || NEAT || — || align=right | 1.4 km || 
|-id=027 bgcolor=#E9E9E9
| 318027 ||  || — || March 12, 2004 || Palomar || NEAT || JUN || align=right | 1.1 km || 
|-id=028 bgcolor=#fefefe
| 318028 ||  || — || March 12, 2004 || Palomar || NEAT || — || align=right | 1.0 km || 
|-id=029 bgcolor=#fefefe
| 318029 ||  || — || March 14, 2004 || Palomar || NEAT || H || align=right data-sort-value="0.96" | 960 m || 
|-id=030 bgcolor=#E9E9E9
| 318030 ||  || — || March 15, 2004 || Kitt Peak || Spacewatch || RAF || align=right data-sort-value="0.90" | 900 m || 
|-id=031 bgcolor=#E9E9E9
| 318031 ||  || — || March 14, 2004 || Palomar || NEAT || — || align=right | 3.8 km || 
|-id=032 bgcolor=#fefefe
| 318032 ||  || — || March 14, 2004 || Kitt Peak || Spacewatch || NYS || align=right data-sort-value="0.96" | 960 m || 
|-id=033 bgcolor=#fefefe
| 318033 ||  || — || March 15, 2004 || Socorro || LINEAR || NYS || align=right data-sort-value="0.70" | 700 m || 
|-id=034 bgcolor=#E9E9E9
| 318034 ||  || — || March 14, 2004 || Kitt Peak || Spacewatch || — || align=right | 1.8 km || 
|-id=035 bgcolor=#E9E9E9
| 318035 ||  || — || March 15, 2004 || Socorro || LINEAR || — || align=right | 1.1 km || 
|-id=036 bgcolor=#E9E9E9
| 318036 ||  || — || March 15, 2004 || Socorro || LINEAR || DOR || align=right | 3.2 km || 
|-id=037 bgcolor=#E9E9E9
| 318037 ||  || — || March 13, 2004 || Palomar || NEAT || RAF || align=right | 1.1 km || 
|-id=038 bgcolor=#E9E9E9
| 318038 ||  || — || March 14, 2004 || Socorro || LINEAR || — || align=right | 3.6 km || 
|-id=039 bgcolor=#fefefe
| 318039 ||  || — || March 15, 2004 || Catalina || CSS || — || align=right | 1.1 km || 
|-id=040 bgcolor=#E9E9E9
| 318040 ||  || — || March 15, 2004 || Kitt Peak || Spacewatch || — || align=right | 1.1 km || 
|-id=041 bgcolor=#E9E9E9
| 318041 ||  || — || March 15, 2004 || Kitt Peak || Spacewatch || — || align=right data-sort-value="0.83" | 830 m || 
|-id=042 bgcolor=#d6d6d6
| 318042 ||  || — || March 14, 2004 || Kitt Peak || Spacewatch || EOS || align=right | 2.1 km || 
|-id=043 bgcolor=#E9E9E9
| 318043 ||  || — || March 16, 2004 || Campo Imperatore || CINEOS || — || align=right | 1.8 km || 
|-id=044 bgcolor=#E9E9E9
| 318044 ||  || — || March 26, 2004 || Socorro || LINEAR || — || align=right | 3.3 km || 
|-id=045 bgcolor=#fefefe
| 318045 ||  || — || March 27, 2004 || Socorro || LINEAR || H || align=right data-sort-value="0.86" | 860 m || 
|-id=046 bgcolor=#E9E9E9
| 318046 ||  || — || March 17, 2004 || Kitt Peak || Spacewatch || — || align=right | 1.2 km || 
|-id=047 bgcolor=#E9E9E9
| 318047 ||  || — || March 17, 2004 || Socorro || LINEAR || EUN || align=right | 1.4 km || 
|-id=048 bgcolor=#fefefe
| 318048 ||  || — || March 29, 2004 || Socorro || LINEAR || H || align=right data-sort-value="0.89" | 890 m || 
|-id=049 bgcolor=#E9E9E9
| 318049 ||  || — || March 29, 2004 || Socorro || LINEAR || — || align=right | 1.5 km || 
|-id=050 bgcolor=#FFC2E0
| 318050 ||  || — || March 30, 2004 || Socorro || LINEAR || AMO || align=right data-sort-value="0.61" | 610 m || 
|-id=051 bgcolor=#E9E9E9
| 318051 ||  || — || March 18, 2004 || Kitt Peak || Spacewatch || — || align=right | 1.4 km || 
|-id=052 bgcolor=#fefefe
| 318052 ||  || — || March 19, 2004 || Socorro || LINEAR || NYS || align=right data-sort-value="0.78" | 780 m || 
|-id=053 bgcolor=#E9E9E9
| 318053 ||  || — || March 19, 2004 || Socorro || LINEAR || — || align=right | 2.1 km || 
|-id=054 bgcolor=#E9E9E9
| 318054 ||  || — || March 18, 2004 || Kitt Peak || Spacewatch || — || align=right data-sort-value="0.97" | 970 m || 
|-id=055 bgcolor=#E9E9E9
| 318055 ||  || — || March 18, 2004 || Kitt Peak || Spacewatch || — || align=right | 1.8 km || 
|-id=056 bgcolor=#E9E9E9
| 318056 ||  || — || March 20, 2004 || Socorro || LINEAR || — || align=right | 2.9 km || 
|-id=057 bgcolor=#E9E9E9
| 318057 ||  || — || March 17, 2004 || Siding Spring || SSS || — || align=right | 1.7 km || 
|-id=058 bgcolor=#d6d6d6
| 318058 ||  || — || March 18, 2004 || Kitt Peak || Spacewatch || — || align=right | 4.5 km || 
|-id=059 bgcolor=#E9E9E9
| 318059 ||  || — || March 20, 2004 || Kitt Peak || Spacewatch || — || align=right | 1.1 km || 
|-id=060 bgcolor=#fefefe
| 318060 ||  || — || March 20, 2004 || Siding Spring || SSS || H || align=right data-sort-value="0.98" | 980 m || 
|-id=061 bgcolor=#E9E9E9
| 318061 ||  || — || March 22, 2004 || Socorro || LINEAR || — || align=right | 1.1 km || 
|-id=062 bgcolor=#E9E9E9
| 318062 ||  || — || March 22, 2004 || Socorro || LINEAR || — || align=right | 2.1 km || 
|-id=063 bgcolor=#E9E9E9
| 318063 ||  || — || March 26, 2004 || Socorro || LINEAR || — || align=right | 1.4 km || 
|-id=064 bgcolor=#E9E9E9
| 318064 ||  || — || March 27, 2004 || Socorro || LINEAR || — || align=right data-sort-value="0.85" | 850 m || 
|-id=065 bgcolor=#E9E9E9
| 318065 ||  || — || March 27, 2004 || Kitt Peak || Spacewatch || — || align=right | 1.5 km || 
|-id=066 bgcolor=#E9E9E9
| 318066 ||  || — || March 28, 2004 || Socorro || LINEAR || — || align=right | 1.8 km || 
|-id=067 bgcolor=#fefefe
| 318067 ||  || — || March 27, 2004 || Socorro || LINEAR || — || align=right data-sort-value="0.75" | 750 m || 
|-id=068 bgcolor=#E9E9E9
| 318068 ||  || — || March 28, 2004 || Socorro || LINEAR || ADE || align=right | 3.0 km || 
|-id=069 bgcolor=#E9E9E9
| 318069 ||  || — || March 16, 2004 || Socorro || LINEAR || EUN || align=right | 1.9 km || 
|-id=070 bgcolor=#E9E9E9
| 318070 ||  || — || March 16, 2004 || Kitt Peak || Spacewatch || — || align=right | 1.3 km || 
|-id=071 bgcolor=#E9E9E9
| 318071 ||  || — || March 17, 2004 || Kitt Peak || Spacewatch || — || align=right | 1.3 km || 
|-id=072 bgcolor=#E9E9E9
| 318072 ||  || — || March 18, 2004 || Socorro || LINEAR || — || align=right | 1.3 km || 
|-id=073 bgcolor=#E9E9E9
| 318073 ||  || — || April 10, 2004 || Palomar || NEAT || JUN || align=right | 1.4 km || 
|-id=074 bgcolor=#E9E9E9
| 318074 ||  || — || April 10, 2004 || Palomar || NEAT || EUN || align=right | 1.5 km || 
|-id=075 bgcolor=#fefefe
| 318075 ||  || — || April 12, 2004 || Kitt Peak || Spacewatch || — || align=right | 1.2 km || 
|-id=076 bgcolor=#E9E9E9
| 318076 ||  || — || April 13, 2004 || Catalina || CSS || — || align=right | 1.8 km || 
|-id=077 bgcolor=#fefefe
| 318077 ||  || — || April 9, 2004 || Siding Spring || SSS || H || align=right data-sort-value="0.84" | 840 m || 
|-id=078 bgcolor=#fefefe
| 318078 ||  || — || April 13, 2004 || Catalina || CSS || H || align=right | 1.1 km || 
|-id=079 bgcolor=#E9E9E9
| 318079 ||  || — || April 13, 2004 || Kitt Peak || Spacewatch || — || align=right | 1.2 km || 
|-id=080 bgcolor=#E9E9E9
| 318080 ||  || — || April 12, 2004 || Palomar || NEAT || JUN || align=right | 1.2 km || 
|-id=081 bgcolor=#d6d6d6
| 318081 ||  || — || April 15, 2004 || Siding Spring || SSS || Tj (2.93) || align=right | 6.6 km || 
|-id=082 bgcolor=#E9E9E9
| 318082 ||  || — || April 9, 2004 || Siding Spring || SSS || MAR || align=right | 1.4 km || 
|-id=083 bgcolor=#E9E9E9
| 318083 ||  || — || April 11, 2004 || Palomar || NEAT || — || align=right | 1.9 km || 
|-id=084 bgcolor=#E9E9E9
| 318084 ||  || — || April 15, 2004 || Palomar || NEAT || — || align=right data-sort-value="0.99" | 990 m || 
|-id=085 bgcolor=#E9E9E9
| 318085 ||  || — || April 14, 2004 || Anderson Mesa || LONEOS || — || align=right | 1.3 km || 
|-id=086 bgcolor=#fefefe
| 318086 ||  || — || April 12, 2004 || Kitt Peak || Spacewatch || — || align=right data-sort-value="0.71" | 710 m || 
|-id=087 bgcolor=#E9E9E9
| 318087 ||  || — || April 12, 2004 || Kitt Peak || Spacewatch || — || align=right | 1.0 km || 
|-id=088 bgcolor=#E9E9E9
| 318088 ||  || — || April 14, 2004 || Kitt Peak || Spacewatch || — || align=right | 1.2 km || 
|-id=089 bgcolor=#fefefe
| 318089 ||  || — || April 13, 2004 || Kitt Peak || Spacewatch || MAS || align=right | 1.0 km || 
|-id=090 bgcolor=#E9E9E9
| 318090 ||  || — || April 13, 2004 || Palomar || NEAT || — || align=right | 3.0 km || 
|-id=091 bgcolor=#E9E9E9
| 318091 ||  || — || April 14, 2004 || Kitt Peak || Spacewatch || JUN || align=right | 1.0 km || 
|-id=092 bgcolor=#E9E9E9
| 318092 ||  || — || April 15, 2004 || Socorro || LINEAR || JUN || align=right | 1.4 km || 
|-id=093 bgcolor=#E9E9E9
| 318093 ||  || — || April 15, 2004 || Kitt Peak || Spacewatch || — || align=right | 1.0 km || 
|-id=094 bgcolor=#E9E9E9
| 318094 ||  || — || April 14, 2004 || Catalina || CSS || — || align=right | 1.6 km || 
|-id=095 bgcolor=#fefefe
| 318095 ||  || — || April 15, 2004 || Socorro || LINEAR || SVE || align=right | 3.9 km || 
|-id=096 bgcolor=#E9E9E9
| 318096 ||  || — || April 13, 2004 || Apache Point || SDSS || HNS || align=right | 1.6 km || 
|-id=097 bgcolor=#E9E9E9
| 318097 ||  || — || April 19, 2004 || Socorro || LINEAR || EUN || align=right | 1.4 km || 
|-id=098 bgcolor=#E9E9E9
| 318098 ||  || — || April 19, 2004 || Goodricke-Pigott || Goodricke-Pigott Obs. || — || align=right | 1.2 km || 
|-id=099 bgcolor=#E9E9E9
| 318099 ||  || — || April 20, 2004 || Socorro || LINEAR || EUN || align=right | 1.9 km || 
|-id=100 bgcolor=#E9E9E9
| 318100 ||  || — || April 16, 2004 || Socorro || LINEAR || JUN || align=right | 1.3 km || 
|}

318101–318200 

|-bgcolor=#C2FFFF
| 318101 ||  || — || April 19, 2004 || Kitt Peak || Spacewatch || L4 || align=right | 12 km || 
|-id=102 bgcolor=#E9E9E9
| 318102 ||  || — || April 20, 2004 || Siding Spring || SSS || JUN || align=right | 1.2 km || 
|-id=103 bgcolor=#fefefe
| 318103 ||  || — || April 21, 2004 || Socorro || LINEAR || — || align=right | 1.1 km || 
|-id=104 bgcolor=#E9E9E9
| 318104 ||  || — || April 21, 2004 || Socorro || LINEAR || RAF || align=right | 1.4 km || 
|-id=105 bgcolor=#E9E9E9
| 318105 ||  || — || April 23, 2004 || Kitt Peak || Spacewatch || — || align=right | 1.4 km || 
|-id=106 bgcolor=#E9E9E9
| 318106 ||  || — || April 21, 2004 || Kitt Peak || Spacewatch || — || align=right | 4.5 km || 
|-id=107 bgcolor=#fefefe
| 318107 ||  || — || January 15, 1997 || Campo Imperatore || CINEOS || — || align=right data-sort-value="0.81" | 810 m || 
|-id=108 bgcolor=#E9E9E9
| 318108 ||  || — || April 30, 2004 || Siding Spring || SSS || — || align=right | 2.0 km || 
|-id=109 bgcolor=#E9E9E9
| 318109 ||  || — || May 11, 2004 || Goodricke-Pigott || R. A. Tucker || — || align=right | 1.5 km || 
|-id=110 bgcolor=#E9E9E9
| 318110 ||  || — || May 12, 2004 || Desert Eagle || W. K. Y. Yeung || — || align=right | 1.0 km || 
|-id=111 bgcolor=#E9E9E9
| 318111 ||  || — || May 13, 2004 || Socorro || LINEAR || — || align=right | 1.8 km || 
|-id=112 bgcolor=#E9E9E9
| 318112 ||  || — || May 13, 2004 || Reedy Creek || J. Broughton || — || align=right | 2.6 km || 
|-id=113 bgcolor=#E9E9E9
| 318113 ||  || — || May 13, 2004 || Socorro || LINEAR || — || align=right | 3.3 km || 
|-id=114 bgcolor=#E9E9E9
| 318114 ||  || — || May 13, 2004 || Anderson Mesa || LONEOS || — || align=right | 1.1 km || 
|-id=115 bgcolor=#E9E9E9
| 318115 ||  || — || May 15, 2004 || Socorro || LINEAR || — || align=right | 1.7 km || 
|-id=116 bgcolor=#E9E9E9
| 318116 ||  || — || May 15, 2004 || Socorro || LINEAR || — || align=right | 2.4 km || 
|-id=117 bgcolor=#E9E9E9
| 318117 ||  || — || May 15, 2004 || Socorro || LINEAR || JUN || align=right | 1.5 km || 
|-id=118 bgcolor=#E9E9E9
| 318118 ||  || — || May 22, 2004 || Catalina || CSS || RAF || align=right | 1.3 km || 
|-id=119 bgcolor=#fefefe
| 318119 ||  || — || May 23, 2004 || Socorro || LINEAR || H || align=right data-sort-value="0.75" | 750 m || 
|-id=120 bgcolor=#E9E9E9
| 318120 ||  || — || May 19, 2004 || Kitt Peak || Spacewatch || — || align=right | 1.9 km || 
|-id=121 bgcolor=#E9E9E9
| 318121 ||  || — || May 23, 2004 || Kitt Peak || Spacewatch || — || align=right | 1.6 km || 
|-id=122 bgcolor=#d6d6d6
| 318122 ||  || — || May 24, 2004 || Socorro || LINEAR || — || align=right | 3.6 km || 
|-id=123 bgcolor=#d6d6d6
| 318123 ||  || — || June 14, 2004 || Reedy Creek || J. Broughton || — || align=right | 3.7 km || 
|-id=124 bgcolor=#E9E9E9
| 318124 ||  || — || June 15, 2004 || Kitt Peak || Spacewatch || — || align=right | 2.6 km || 
|-id=125 bgcolor=#E9E9E9
| 318125 ||  || — || June 12, 2004 || Kitt Peak || Spacewatch || — || align=right | 1.2 km || 
|-id=126 bgcolor=#E9E9E9
| 318126 ||  || — || July 9, 2004 || Socorro || LINEAR || — || align=right | 1.5 km || 
|-id=127 bgcolor=#E9E9E9
| 318127 ||  || — || July 11, 2004 || Socorro || LINEAR || — || align=right | 2.1 km || 
|-id=128 bgcolor=#d6d6d6
| 318128 ||  || — || July 10, 2004 || Palomar || NEAT || — || align=right | 3.8 km || 
|-id=129 bgcolor=#d6d6d6
| 318129 ||  || — || July 15, 2004 || Siding Spring || SSS || — || align=right | 5.1 km || 
|-id=130 bgcolor=#E9E9E9
| 318130 ||  || — || July 16, 2004 || Socorro || LINEAR || — || align=right | 3.3 km || 
|-id=131 bgcolor=#fefefe
| 318131 ||  || — || July 16, 2004 || Socorro || LINEAR || — || align=right | 1.1 km || 
|-id=132 bgcolor=#d6d6d6
| 318132 ||  || — || July 21, 2004 || Reedy Creek || J. Broughton || — || align=right | 3.8 km || 
|-id=133 bgcolor=#E9E9E9
| 318133 ||  || — || August 7, 2004 || Reedy Creek || J. Broughton || — || align=right | 1.7 km || 
|-id=134 bgcolor=#E9E9E9
| 318134 ||  || — || August 7, 2004 || Palomar || NEAT || — || align=right | 1.8 km || 
|-id=135 bgcolor=#fefefe
| 318135 ||  || — || August 8, 2004 || Socorro || LINEAR || NYS || align=right data-sort-value="0.80" | 800 m || 
|-id=136 bgcolor=#d6d6d6
| 318136 ||  || — || August 7, 2004 || Palomar || NEAT || — || align=right | 2.3 km || 
|-id=137 bgcolor=#E9E9E9
| 318137 ||  || — || August 8, 2004 || Anderson Mesa || LONEOS || INO || align=right | 1.6 km || 
|-id=138 bgcolor=#E9E9E9
| 318138 ||  || — || August 9, 2004 || Socorro || LINEAR || — || align=right | 2.9 km || 
|-id=139 bgcolor=#d6d6d6
| 318139 ||  || — || August 9, 2004 || Siding Spring || SSS || — || align=right | 4.0 km || 
|-id=140 bgcolor=#d6d6d6
| 318140 ||  || — || August 10, 2004 || Socorro || LINEAR || MEL || align=right | 4.7 km || 
|-id=141 bgcolor=#fefefe
| 318141 ||  || — || August 7, 2004 || Siding Spring || SSS || V || align=right data-sort-value="0.75" | 750 m || 
|-id=142 bgcolor=#fefefe
| 318142 ||  || — || August 8, 2004 || Socorro || LINEAR || NYS || align=right data-sort-value="0.86" | 860 m || 
|-id=143 bgcolor=#d6d6d6
| 318143 ||  || — || August 9, 2004 || Anderson Mesa || LONEOS || — || align=right | 3.7 km || 
|-id=144 bgcolor=#E9E9E9
| 318144 ||  || — || August 10, 2004 || Socorro || LINEAR || — || align=right | 2.8 km || 
|-id=145 bgcolor=#E9E9E9
| 318145 ||  || — || August 11, 2004 || Socorro || LINEAR || — || align=right | 2.5 km || 
|-id=146 bgcolor=#d6d6d6
| 318146 ||  || — || August 7, 2004 || Palomar || NEAT || — || align=right | 3.2 km || 
|-id=147 bgcolor=#E9E9E9
| 318147 ||  || — || August 8, 2004 || Socorro || LINEAR || — || align=right | 1.4 km || 
|-id=148 bgcolor=#E9E9E9
| 318148 ||  || — || August 9, 2004 || Socorro || LINEAR || TIN || align=right | 1.4 km || 
|-id=149 bgcolor=#E9E9E9
| 318149 ||  || — || August 8, 2004 || Campo Imperatore || CINEOS || — || align=right | 2.8 km || 
|-id=150 bgcolor=#E9E9E9
| 318150 ||  || — || August 12, 2004 || Socorro || LINEAR || — || align=right | 1.3 km || 
|-id=151 bgcolor=#d6d6d6
| 318151 ||  || — || August 12, 2004 || Socorro || LINEAR || — || align=right | 3.3 km || 
|-id=152 bgcolor=#E9E9E9
| 318152 ||  || — || August 10, 2004 || Anderson Mesa || LONEOS || DOR || align=right | 3.0 km || 
|-id=153 bgcolor=#d6d6d6
| 318153 ||  || — || August 10, 2004 || Anderson Mesa || LONEOS || — || align=right | 3.5 km || 
|-id=154 bgcolor=#E9E9E9
| 318154 ||  || — || August 12, 2004 || Socorro || LINEAR || — || align=right | 4.5 km || 
|-id=155 bgcolor=#d6d6d6
| 318155 ||  || — || August 12, 2004 || Socorro || LINEAR || — || align=right | 4.7 km || 
|-id=156 bgcolor=#fefefe
| 318156 ||  || — || August 11, 2004 || Socorro || LINEAR || NYS || align=right data-sort-value="0.83" | 830 m || 
|-id=157 bgcolor=#E9E9E9
| 318157 ||  || — || August 11, 2004 || Socorro || LINEAR || — || align=right | 2.4 km || 
|-id=158 bgcolor=#E9E9E9
| 318158 ||  || — || August 8, 2004 || Socorro || LINEAR || GEF || align=right | 1.8 km || 
|-id=159 bgcolor=#d6d6d6
| 318159 || 2004 QH || — || August 17, 2004 || Majorca || OAM Obs. || — || align=right | 4.7 km || 
|-id=160 bgcolor=#FFC2E0
| 318160 ||  || — || August 20, 2004 || Catalina || CSS || AMO +1km || align=right data-sort-value="0.85" | 850 m || 
|-id=161 bgcolor=#d6d6d6
| 318161 ||  || — || August 16, 2004 || Palomar || NEAT || EUP || align=right | 4.2 km || 
|-id=162 bgcolor=#E9E9E9
| 318162 ||  || — || August 20, 2004 || Goodricke-Pigott || R. A. Tucker || — || align=right | 3.8 km || 
|-id=163 bgcolor=#d6d6d6
| 318163 ||  || — || August 21, 2004 || Siding Spring || SSS || TIR || align=right | 3.1 km || 
|-id=164 bgcolor=#d6d6d6
| 318164 ||  || — || August 22, 2004 || Kitt Peak || Spacewatch || TEL || align=right | 2.1 km || 
|-id=165 bgcolor=#d6d6d6
| 318165 ||  || — || August 21, 2004 || Catalina || CSS || BRA || align=right | 2.1 km || 
|-id=166 bgcolor=#fefefe
| 318166 ||  || — || August 23, 2004 || Kitt Peak || Spacewatch || — || align=right | 1.00 km || 
|-id=167 bgcolor=#d6d6d6
| 318167 ||  || — || August 27, 2004 || Socorro || LINEAR || EUP || align=right | 6.0 km || 
|-id=168 bgcolor=#d6d6d6
| 318168 || 2004 RY || — || September 5, 2004 || Kleť || Kleť Obs. || — || align=right | 3.2 km || 
|-id=169 bgcolor=#E9E9E9
| 318169 ||  || — || September 4, 2004 || Palomar || NEAT || — || align=right | 1.2 km || 
|-id=170 bgcolor=#d6d6d6
| 318170 ||  || — || September 6, 2004 || Goodricke-Pigott || Goodricke-Pigott Obs. || — || align=right | 4.8 km || 
|-id=171 bgcolor=#d6d6d6
| 318171 ||  || — || September 7, 2004 || Socorro || LINEAR || — || align=right | 3.1 km || 
|-id=172 bgcolor=#d6d6d6
| 318172 ||  || — || September 6, 2004 || Siding Spring || SSS || EOS || align=right | 2.5 km || 
|-id=173 bgcolor=#d6d6d6
| 318173 ||  || — || September 7, 2004 || Kitt Peak || Spacewatch || — || align=right | 3.0 km || 
|-id=174 bgcolor=#fefefe
| 318174 ||  || — || September 9, 2004 || Socorro || LINEAR || — || align=right | 1.0 km || 
|-id=175 bgcolor=#E9E9E9
| 318175 ||  || — || September 7, 2004 || Socorro || LINEAR || — || align=right | 3.0 km || 
|-id=176 bgcolor=#d6d6d6
| 318176 ||  || — || September 7, 2004 || Socorro || LINEAR || EOS || align=right | 2.7 km || 
|-id=177 bgcolor=#d6d6d6
| 318177 ||  || — || September 7, 2004 || Socorro || LINEAR || BRA || align=right | 1.9 km || 
|-id=178 bgcolor=#fefefe
| 318178 ||  || — || September 7, 2004 || Socorro || LINEAR || NYS || align=right data-sort-value="0.80" | 800 m || 
|-id=179 bgcolor=#E9E9E9
| 318179 ||  || — || September 8, 2004 || Socorro || LINEAR || — || align=right | 3.0 km || 
|-id=180 bgcolor=#d6d6d6
| 318180 ||  || — || September 8, 2004 || Socorro || LINEAR || 637 || align=right | 2.8 km || 
|-id=181 bgcolor=#fefefe
| 318181 ||  || — || September 8, 2004 || Socorro || LINEAR || — || align=right data-sort-value="0.76" | 760 m || 
|-id=182 bgcolor=#d6d6d6
| 318182 ||  || — || September 8, 2004 || Socorro || LINEAR || — || align=right | 3.2 km || 
|-id=183 bgcolor=#d6d6d6
| 318183 ||  || — || September 8, 2004 || Socorro || LINEAR || — || align=right | 3.2 km || 
|-id=184 bgcolor=#fefefe
| 318184 ||  || — || September 8, 2004 || Socorro || LINEAR || MAS || align=right | 1.0 km || 
|-id=185 bgcolor=#E9E9E9
| 318185 ||  || — || September 8, 2004 || Socorro || LINEAR || JUN || align=right | 1.2 km || 
|-id=186 bgcolor=#d6d6d6
| 318186 ||  || — || September 8, 2004 || Socorro || LINEAR || EOS || align=right | 2.7 km || 
|-id=187 bgcolor=#d6d6d6
| 318187 ||  || — || September 8, 2004 || Socorro || LINEAR || — || align=right | 3.9 km || 
|-id=188 bgcolor=#fefefe
| 318188 ||  || — || September 8, 2004 || Socorro || LINEAR || — || align=right | 1.3 km || 
|-id=189 bgcolor=#E9E9E9
| 318189 ||  || — || September 8, 2004 || Socorro || LINEAR || — || align=right | 2.9 km || 
|-id=190 bgcolor=#d6d6d6
| 318190 ||  || — || September 7, 2004 || Goodricke-Pigott || R. A. Tucker || — || align=right | 3.2 km || 
|-id=191 bgcolor=#d6d6d6
| 318191 ||  || — || September 8, 2004 || Palomar || NEAT || — || align=right | 4.0 km || 
|-id=192 bgcolor=#d6d6d6
| 318192 ||  || — || September 8, 2004 || Palomar || NEAT || — || align=right | 3.9 km || 
|-id=193 bgcolor=#d6d6d6
| 318193 ||  || — || September 9, 2004 || Socorro || LINEAR || — || align=right | 3.9 km || 
|-id=194 bgcolor=#d6d6d6
| 318194 ||  || — || August 25, 2004 || Kitt Peak || Spacewatch || — || align=right | 2.9 km || 
|-id=195 bgcolor=#E9E9E9
| 318195 ||  || — || September 7, 2004 || Socorro || LINEAR || — || align=right | 2.1 km || 
|-id=196 bgcolor=#d6d6d6
| 318196 ||  || — || September 7, 2004 || Kitt Peak || Spacewatch || KOR || align=right | 2.0 km || 
|-id=197 bgcolor=#d6d6d6
| 318197 ||  || — || September 7, 2004 || Kitt Peak || Spacewatch || KOR || align=right | 1.4 km || 
|-id=198 bgcolor=#fefefe
| 318198 ||  || — || September 7, 2004 || Kitt Peak || Spacewatch || — || align=right data-sort-value="0.93" | 930 m || 
|-id=199 bgcolor=#d6d6d6
| 318199 ||  || — || September 7, 2004 || Kitt Peak || Spacewatch || KOR || align=right | 1.4 km || 
|-id=200 bgcolor=#d6d6d6
| 318200 ||  || — || September 8, 2004 || Socorro || LINEAR || EOS || align=right | 2.1 km || 
|}

318201–318300 

|-bgcolor=#E9E9E9
| 318201 ||  || — || September 8, 2004 || Socorro || LINEAR || — || align=right data-sort-value="0.98" | 980 m || 
|-id=202 bgcolor=#d6d6d6
| 318202 ||  || — || September 8, 2004 || Socorro || LINEAR || — || align=right | 4.2 km || 
|-id=203 bgcolor=#d6d6d6
| 318203 ||  || — || September 8, 2004 || Palomar || NEAT || — || align=right | 4.2 km || 
|-id=204 bgcolor=#E9E9E9
| 318204 ||  || — || September 10, 2004 || Kitt Peak || Spacewatch || — || align=right | 1.0 km || 
|-id=205 bgcolor=#d6d6d6
| 318205 ||  || — || September 8, 2004 || Socorro || LINEAR || — || align=right | 3.1 km || 
|-id=206 bgcolor=#E9E9E9
| 318206 ||  || — || September 10, 2004 || Socorro || LINEAR || — || align=right | 2.0 km || 
|-id=207 bgcolor=#E9E9E9
| 318207 ||  || — || September 10, 2004 || Socorro || LINEAR || — || align=right | 2.9 km || 
|-id=208 bgcolor=#E9E9E9
| 318208 ||  || — || September 10, 2004 || Socorro || LINEAR || — || align=right | 3.6 km || 
|-id=209 bgcolor=#d6d6d6
| 318209 ||  || — || September 10, 2004 || Socorro || LINEAR || — || align=right | 4.9 km || 
|-id=210 bgcolor=#d6d6d6
| 318210 ||  || — || September 10, 2004 || Socorro || LINEAR || — || align=right | 4.7 km || 
|-id=211 bgcolor=#fefefe
| 318211 ||  || — || September 10, 2004 || Socorro || LINEAR || — || align=right data-sort-value="0.75" | 750 m || 
|-id=212 bgcolor=#E9E9E9
| 318212 ||  || — || September 10, 2004 || Socorro || LINEAR || — || align=right | 1.2 km || 
|-id=213 bgcolor=#d6d6d6
| 318213 ||  || — || September 10, 2004 || Socorro || LINEAR || — || align=right | 4.7 km || 
|-id=214 bgcolor=#d6d6d6
| 318214 ||  || — || September 10, 2004 || Socorro || LINEAR || NAE || align=right | 3.8 km || 
|-id=215 bgcolor=#d6d6d6
| 318215 ||  || — || September 10, 2004 || Socorro || LINEAR || — || align=right | 3.6 km || 
|-id=216 bgcolor=#d6d6d6
| 318216 ||  || — || September 10, 2004 || Socorro || LINEAR || — || align=right | 3.6 km || 
|-id=217 bgcolor=#d6d6d6
| 318217 ||  || — || September 10, 2004 || Socorro || LINEAR || — || align=right | 5.4 km || 
|-id=218 bgcolor=#d6d6d6
| 318218 ||  || — || September 11, 2004 || Kitt Peak || Spacewatch || EOS || align=right | 1.9 km || 
|-id=219 bgcolor=#d6d6d6
| 318219 ||  || — || September 10, 2004 || Socorro || LINEAR || — || align=right | 4.7 km || 
|-id=220 bgcolor=#d6d6d6
| 318220 ||  || — || September 11, 2004 || Socorro || LINEAR || — || align=right | 3.5 km || 
|-id=221 bgcolor=#d6d6d6
| 318221 ||  || — || September 11, 2004 || Socorro || LINEAR || — || align=right | 3.8 km || 
|-id=222 bgcolor=#d6d6d6
| 318222 ||  || — || September 11, 2004 || Socorro || LINEAR || FIR || align=right | 4.2 km || 
|-id=223 bgcolor=#d6d6d6
| 318223 ||  || — || September 11, 2004 || Socorro || LINEAR || THB || align=right | 6.0 km || 
|-id=224 bgcolor=#d6d6d6
| 318224 ||  || — || September 11, 2004 || Socorro || LINEAR || — || align=right | 3.6 km || 
|-id=225 bgcolor=#d6d6d6
| 318225 ||  || — || September 11, 2004 || Socorro || LINEAR || — || align=right | 5.5 km || 
|-id=226 bgcolor=#d6d6d6
| 318226 ||  || — || September 11, 2004 || Socorro || LINEAR || URS || align=right | 4.0 km || 
|-id=227 bgcolor=#d6d6d6
| 318227 ||  || — || September 11, 2004 || Socorro || LINEAR || — || align=right | 4.1 km || 
|-id=228 bgcolor=#d6d6d6
| 318228 ||  || — || September 11, 2004 || Socorro || LINEAR || — || align=right | 4.7 km || 
|-id=229 bgcolor=#d6d6d6
| 318229 ||  || — || September 11, 2004 || Socorro || LINEAR || — || align=right | 4.4 km || 
|-id=230 bgcolor=#d6d6d6
| 318230 ||  || — || September 12, 2004 || Socorro || LINEAR || — || align=right | 4.2 km || 
|-id=231 bgcolor=#d6d6d6
| 318231 ||  || — || September 9, 2004 || Socorro || LINEAR || EUP || align=right | 4.9 km || 
|-id=232 bgcolor=#d6d6d6
| 318232 ||  || — || September 9, 2004 || Kitt Peak || Spacewatch || EOS || align=right | 2.0 km || 
|-id=233 bgcolor=#E9E9E9
| 318233 ||  || — || September 9, 2004 || Kitt Peak || Spacewatch || — || align=right | 1.4 km || 
|-id=234 bgcolor=#d6d6d6
| 318234 ||  || — || September 9, 2004 || Kitt Peak || Spacewatch || THM || align=right | 2.8 km || 
|-id=235 bgcolor=#d6d6d6
| 318235 ||  || — || September 10, 2004 || Kitt Peak || Spacewatch || — || align=right | 3.6 km || 
|-id=236 bgcolor=#fefefe
| 318236 ||  || — || September 10, 2004 || Kitt Peak || Spacewatch || — || align=right data-sort-value="0.65" | 650 m || 
|-id=237 bgcolor=#d6d6d6
| 318237 ||  || — || September 10, 2004 || Kitt Peak || Spacewatch || — || align=right | 2.7 km || 
|-id=238 bgcolor=#E9E9E9
| 318238 ||  || — || September 6, 2004 || Palomar || NEAT || ADE || align=right | 2.9 km || 
|-id=239 bgcolor=#E9E9E9
| 318239 ||  || — || September 11, 2004 || Kitt Peak || Spacewatch || — || align=right | 1.8 km || 
|-id=240 bgcolor=#E9E9E9
| 318240 ||  || — || September 11, 2004 || Kitt Peak || Spacewatch || — || align=right | 3.2 km || 
|-id=241 bgcolor=#d6d6d6
| 318241 ||  || — || September 11, 2004 || Kitt Peak || Spacewatch || — || align=right | 3.3 km || 
|-id=242 bgcolor=#d6d6d6
| 318242 ||  || — || September 13, 2004 || Kitt Peak || Spacewatch || — || align=right | 2.5 km || 
|-id=243 bgcolor=#E9E9E9
| 318243 ||  || — || September 15, 2004 || Kitt Peak || Spacewatch || — || align=right data-sort-value="0.96" | 960 m || 
|-id=244 bgcolor=#d6d6d6
| 318244 ||  || — || September 15, 2004 || Kitt Peak || Spacewatch || K-2 || align=right | 1.4 km || 
|-id=245 bgcolor=#d6d6d6
| 318245 ||  || — || September 10, 2004 || Kitt Peak || Spacewatch || CHA || align=right | 2.7 km || 
|-id=246 bgcolor=#d6d6d6
| 318246 ||  || — || September 11, 2004 || Kitt Peak || Spacewatch || — || align=right | 2.3 km || 
|-id=247 bgcolor=#d6d6d6
| 318247 ||  || — || September 12, 2004 || Kitt Peak || Spacewatch || EOS || align=right | 1.5 km || 
|-id=248 bgcolor=#d6d6d6
| 318248 ||  || — || September 13, 2004 || Socorro || LINEAR || — || align=right | 4.8 km || 
|-id=249 bgcolor=#d6d6d6
| 318249 ||  || — || September 13, 2004 || Socorro || LINEAR || MEL || align=right | 4.9 km || 
|-id=250 bgcolor=#fefefe
| 318250 ||  || — || September 14, 2004 || Palomar || NEAT || NYS || align=right data-sort-value="0.87" | 870 m || 
|-id=251 bgcolor=#d6d6d6
| 318251 ||  || — || September 15, 2004 || Siding Spring || SSS || TIR || align=right | 3.7 km || 
|-id=252 bgcolor=#d6d6d6
| 318252 ||  || — || September 13, 2004 || Socorro || LINEAR || — || align=right | 3.7 km || 
|-id=253 bgcolor=#d6d6d6
| 318253 ||  || — || September 14, 2004 || Palomar || NEAT || — || align=right | 3.8 km || 
|-id=254 bgcolor=#d6d6d6
| 318254 ||  || — || September 15, 2004 || Anderson Mesa || LONEOS || — || align=right | 3.5 km || 
|-id=255 bgcolor=#d6d6d6
| 318255 ||  || — || September 15, 2004 || Kitt Peak || Spacewatch || LIX || align=right | 3.6 km || 
|-id=256 bgcolor=#E9E9E9
| 318256 ||  || — || September 15, 2004 || Kitt Peak || Spacewatch || — || align=right data-sort-value="0.82" | 820 m || 
|-id=257 bgcolor=#fefefe
| 318257 ||  || — || September 7, 2004 || Kitt Peak || Spacewatch || — || align=right | 1.0 km || 
|-id=258 bgcolor=#d6d6d6
| 318258 ||  || — || January 26, 2001 || Apache Point || SDSS || — || align=right | 4.7 km || 
|-id=259 bgcolor=#E9E9E9
| 318259 ||  || — || September 9, 2004 || Socorro || LINEAR || — || align=right | 3.7 km || 
|-id=260 bgcolor=#E9E9E9
| 318260 ||  || — || September 17, 2004 || Kitt Peak || Spacewatch || — || align=right | 2.9 km || 
|-id=261 bgcolor=#E9E9E9
| 318261 ||  || — || September 16, 2004 || Siding Spring || SSS || — || align=right | 2.6 km || 
|-id=262 bgcolor=#d6d6d6
| 318262 ||  || — || September 16, 2004 || Siding Spring || SSS || — || align=right | 5.1 km || 
|-id=263 bgcolor=#E9E9E9
| 318263 ||  || — || September 17, 2004 || Socorro || LINEAR || MAR || align=right | 1.5 km || 
|-id=264 bgcolor=#d6d6d6
| 318264 ||  || — || September 7, 2004 || Socorro || LINEAR || — || align=right | 4.5 km || 
|-id=265 bgcolor=#d6d6d6
| 318265 ||  || — || September 17, 2004 || Drebach || Drebach Obs. || — || align=right | 4.0 km || 
|-id=266 bgcolor=#E9E9E9
| 318266 ||  || — || September 17, 2004 || Desert Eagle || W. K. Y. Yeung || — || align=right | 2.5 km || 
|-id=267 bgcolor=#d6d6d6
| 318267 ||  || — || September 17, 2004 || Socorro || LINEAR || — || align=right | 4.0 km || 
|-id=268 bgcolor=#d6d6d6
| 318268 ||  || — || September 17, 2004 || Kitt Peak || Spacewatch || — || align=right | 2.6 km || 
|-id=269 bgcolor=#d6d6d6
| 318269 ||  || — || September 18, 2004 || Socorro || LINEAR || — || align=right | 4.4 km || 
|-id=270 bgcolor=#d6d6d6
| 318270 ||  || — || September 18, 2004 || Socorro || LINEAR || EOS || align=right | 2.5 km || 
|-id=271 bgcolor=#E9E9E9
| 318271 ||  || — || September 22, 2004 || Socorro || LINEAR || — || align=right | 2.8 km || 
|-id=272 bgcolor=#d6d6d6
| 318272 ||  || — || September 17, 2004 || Anderson Mesa || LONEOS || — || align=right | 4.2 km || 
|-id=273 bgcolor=#fefefe
| 318273 ||  || — || October 4, 2004 || Kitt Peak || Spacewatch || FLO || align=right data-sort-value="0.94" | 940 m || 
|-id=274 bgcolor=#E9E9E9
| 318274 ||  || — || October 3, 2004 || Palomar || NEAT || — || align=right | 2.3 km || 
|-id=275 bgcolor=#E9E9E9
| 318275 ||  || — || October 11, 2004 || Sögel || H. Roclawski || HNS || align=right | 2.1 km || 
|-id=276 bgcolor=#d6d6d6
| 318276 ||  || — || October 10, 2004 || Socorro || LINEAR || EUP || align=right | 3.8 km || 
|-id=277 bgcolor=#d6d6d6
| 318277 ||  || — || October 11, 2004 || Moletai || K. Černis, J. Zdanavičius || — || align=right | 4.4 km || 
|-id=278 bgcolor=#d6d6d6
| 318278 ||  || — || October 11, 2004 || Goodricke-Pigott || R. A. Tucker || EOS || align=right | 2.5 km || 
|-id=279 bgcolor=#E9E9E9
| 318279 ||  || — || October 4, 2004 || Kitt Peak || Spacewatch || — || align=right | 3.8 km || 
|-id=280 bgcolor=#d6d6d6
| 318280 ||  || — || October 4, 2004 || Kitt Peak || Spacewatch || — || align=right | 3.2 km || 
|-id=281 bgcolor=#d6d6d6
| 318281 ||  || — || October 4, 2004 || Anderson Mesa || LONEOS || — || align=right | 3.8 km || 
|-id=282 bgcolor=#d6d6d6
| 318282 ||  || — || October 4, 2004 || Kitt Peak || Spacewatch || — || align=right | 4.0 km || 
|-id=283 bgcolor=#d6d6d6
| 318283 ||  || — || October 4, 2004 || Kitt Peak || Spacewatch || — || align=right | 3.2 km || 
|-id=284 bgcolor=#d6d6d6
| 318284 ||  || — || October 4, 2004 || Kitt Peak || Spacewatch || THM || align=right | 2.2 km || 
|-id=285 bgcolor=#fefefe
| 318285 ||  || — || October 4, 2004 || Kitt Peak || Spacewatch || MAS || align=right data-sort-value="0.90" | 900 m || 
|-id=286 bgcolor=#E9E9E9
| 318286 ||  || — || October 4, 2004 || Kitt Peak || Spacewatch || — || align=right | 2.7 km || 
|-id=287 bgcolor=#E9E9E9
| 318287 ||  || — || October 4, 2004 || Kitt Peak || Spacewatch || — || align=right | 1.4 km || 
|-id=288 bgcolor=#d6d6d6
| 318288 ||  || — || October 4, 2004 || Kitt Peak || Spacewatch || HYG || align=right | 3.4 km || 
|-id=289 bgcolor=#d6d6d6
| 318289 ||  || — || October 4, 2004 || Kitt Peak || Spacewatch || — || align=right | 4.7 km || 
|-id=290 bgcolor=#fefefe
| 318290 ||  || — || October 4, 2004 || Kitt Peak || Spacewatch || — || align=right | 1.5 km || 
|-id=291 bgcolor=#d6d6d6
| 318291 ||  || — || October 4, 2004 || Kitt Peak || Spacewatch || — || align=right | 4.0 km || 
|-id=292 bgcolor=#E9E9E9
| 318292 ||  || — || October 4, 2004 || Kitt Peak || Spacewatch || — || align=right | 1.1 km || 
|-id=293 bgcolor=#E9E9E9
| 318293 ||  || — || October 5, 2004 || Kitt Peak || Spacewatch || — || align=right | 1.2 km || 
|-id=294 bgcolor=#d6d6d6
| 318294 ||  || — || October 5, 2004 || Kitt Peak || Spacewatch || — || align=right | 3.3 km || 
|-id=295 bgcolor=#d6d6d6
| 318295 ||  || — || October 5, 2004 || Anderson Mesa || LONEOS || 628 || align=right | 3.1 km || 
|-id=296 bgcolor=#d6d6d6
| 318296 ||  || — || October 5, 2004 || Palomar || NEAT || — || align=right | 3.4 km || 
|-id=297 bgcolor=#d6d6d6
| 318297 ||  || — || October 6, 2004 || Kitt Peak || Spacewatch || — || align=right | 4.0 km || 
|-id=298 bgcolor=#d6d6d6
| 318298 ||  || — || October 6, 2004 || Kitt Peak || Spacewatch || EOS || align=right | 2.4 km || 
|-id=299 bgcolor=#d6d6d6
| 318299 ||  || — || October 7, 2004 || Anderson Mesa || LONEOS || 7:4* || align=right | 3.1 km || 
|-id=300 bgcolor=#fefefe
| 318300 ||  || — || October 5, 2004 || Kitt Peak || Spacewatch || — || align=right data-sort-value="0.66" | 660 m || 
|}

318301–318400 

|-bgcolor=#d6d6d6
| 318301 ||  || — || October 5, 2004 || Kitt Peak || Spacewatch || EOS || align=right | 1.9 km || 
|-id=302 bgcolor=#E9E9E9
| 318302 ||  || — || October 5, 2004 || Kitt Peak || Spacewatch || AST || align=right | 1.8 km || 
|-id=303 bgcolor=#d6d6d6
| 318303 ||  || — || October 5, 2004 || Kitt Peak || Spacewatch || EOS || align=right | 1.6 km || 
|-id=304 bgcolor=#d6d6d6
| 318304 ||  || — || October 5, 2004 || Kitt Peak || Spacewatch || — || align=right | 2.8 km || 
|-id=305 bgcolor=#d6d6d6
| 318305 ||  || — || October 5, 2004 || Kitt Peak || Spacewatch || — || align=right | 4.1 km || 
|-id=306 bgcolor=#d6d6d6
| 318306 ||  || — || October 5, 2004 || Kitt Peak || Spacewatch || — || align=right | 2.8 km || 
|-id=307 bgcolor=#E9E9E9
| 318307 ||  || — || October 7, 2004 || Socorro || LINEAR || — || align=right | 3.7 km || 
|-id=308 bgcolor=#d6d6d6
| 318308 ||  || — || October 7, 2004 || Kitt Peak || Spacewatch || — || align=right | 4.0 km || 
|-id=309 bgcolor=#fefefe
| 318309 ||  || — || October 5, 2004 || Anderson Mesa || LONEOS || — || align=right data-sort-value="0.70" | 700 m || 
|-id=310 bgcolor=#E9E9E9
| 318310 ||  || — || October 7, 2004 || Socorro || LINEAR || — || align=right | 3.4 km || 
|-id=311 bgcolor=#d6d6d6
| 318311 ||  || — || October 7, 2004 || Socorro || LINEAR || VER || align=right | 3.5 km || 
|-id=312 bgcolor=#fefefe
| 318312 ||  || — || October 7, 2004 || Anderson Mesa || LONEOS || — || align=right data-sort-value="0.88" | 880 m || 
|-id=313 bgcolor=#d6d6d6
| 318313 ||  || — || October 7, 2004 || Anderson Mesa || LONEOS || EMA || align=right | 4.4 km || 
|-id=314 bgcolor=#d6d6d6
| 318314 ||  || — || October 8, 2004 || Anderson Mesa || LONEOS || — || align=right | 3.6 km || 
|-id=315 bgcolor=#d6d6d6
| 318315 ||  || — || October 4, 2004 || Kitt Peak || Spacewatch || EMA || align=right | 3.5 km || 
|-id=316 bgcolor=#E9E9E9
| 318316 ||  || — || October 5, 2004 || Kitt Peak || Spacewatch || — || align=right data-sort-value="0.98" | 980 m || 
|-id=317 bgcolor=#fefefe
| 318317 ||  || — || February 22, 2003 || Kitt Peak || Spacewatch || — || align=right data-sort-value="0.81" | 810 m || 
|-id=318 bgcolor=#d6d6d6
| 318318 ||  || — || October 6, 2004 || Kitt Peak || Spacewatch || JLI || align=right | 4.2 km || 
|-id=319 bgcolor=#d6d6d6
| 318319 ||  || — || October 6, 2004 || Kitt Peak || Spacewatch || — || align=right | 3.0 km || 
|-id=320 bgcolor=#fefefe
| 318320 ||  || — || October 6, 2004 || Kitt Peak || Spacewatch || FLO || align=right data-sort-value="0.65" | 650 m || 
|-id=321 bgcolor=#fefefe
| 318321 ||  || — || October 6, 2004 || Kitt Peak || Spacewatch || MAS || align=right data-sort-value="0.78" | 780 m || 
|-id=322 bgcolor=#d6d6d6
| 318322 ||  || — || October 7, 2004 || Socorro || LINEAR || — || align=right | 4.6 km || 
|-id=323 bgcolor=#fefefe
| 318323 ||  || — || October 9, 2004 || Socorro || LINEAR || — || align=right data-sort-value="0.80" | 800 m || 
|-id=324 bgcolor=#d6d6d6
| 318324 ||  || — || October 7, 2004 || Kitt Peak || Spacewatch || KOR || align=right | 1.8 km || 
|-id=325 bgcolor=#E9E9E9
| 318325 ||  || — || October 7, 2004 || Kitt Peak || Spacewatch || HEN || align=right data-sort-value="0.93" | 930 m || 
|-id=326 bgcolor=#fefefe
| 318326 ||  || — || October 7, 2004 || Kitt Peak || Spacewatch || — || align=right | 1.0 km || 
|-id=327 bgcolor=#d6d6d6
| 318327 ||  || — || October 7, 2004 || Kitt Peak || Spacewatch || — || align=right | 2.8 km || 
|-id=328 bgcolor=#d6d6d6
| 318328 ||  || — || October 7, 2004 || Kitt Peak || Spacewatch || EOS || align=right | 2.5 km || 
|-id=329 bgcolor=#d6d6d6
| 318329 ||  || — || October 7, 2004 || Kitt Peak || Spacewatch || — || align=right | 3.8 km || 
|-id=330 bgcolor=#E9E9E9
| 318330 ||  || — || October 7, 2004 || Kitt Peak || Spacewatch || — || align=right | 1.6 km || 
|-id=331 bgcolor=#d6d6d6
| 318331 ||  || — || October 7, 2004 || Kitt Peak || Spacewatch || VER || align=right | 3.7 km || 
|-id=332 bgcolor=#d6d6d6
| 318332 ||  || — || October 7, 2004 || Kitt Peak || Spacewatch || HYG || align=right | 3.9 km || 
|-id=333 bgcolor=#E9E9E9
| 318333 ||  || — || October 7, 2004 || Kitt Peak || Spacewatch || — || align=right | 1.5 km || 
|-id=334 bgcolor=#d6d6d6
| 318334 ||  || — || October 7, 2004 || Kitt Peak || Spacewatch || — || align=right | 3.4 km || 
|-id=335 bgcolor=#d6d6d6
| 318335 ||  || — || October 7, 2004 || Kitt Peak || Spacewatch || — || align=right | 3.4 km || 
|-id=336 bgcolor=#d6d6d6
| 318336 ||  || — || October 9, 2004 || Kitt Peak || Spacewatch || HYG || align=right | 4.0 km || 
|-id=337 bgcolor=#d6d6d6
| 318337 ||  || — || October 9, 2004 || Kitt Peak || Spacewatch || — || align=right | 3.9 km || 
|-id=338 bgcolor=#d6d6d6
| 318338 ||  || — || October 10, 2004 || Kitt Peak || Spacewatch || EOS || align=right | 2.1 km || 
|-id=339 bgcolor=#d6d6d6
| 318339 ||  || — || October 5, 2004 || Kitt Peak || Spacewatch || — || align=right | 4.4 km || 
|-id=340 bgcolor=#d6d6d6
| 318340 ||  || — || October 7, 2004 || Palomar || NEAT || — || align=right | 4.2 km || 
|-id=341 bgcolor=#E9E9E9
| 318341 ||  || — || October 8, 2004 || Kitt Peak || Spacewatch || — || align=right | 2.2 km || 
|-id=342 bgcolor=#d6d6d6
| 318342 ||  || — || October 7, 2004 || Kitt Peak || Spacewatch || THM || align=right | 2.8 km || 
|-id=343 bgcolor=#E9E9E9
| 318343 ||  || — || October 9, 2004 || Kitt Peak || Spacewatch || HOF || align=right | 2.9 km || 
|-id=344 bgcolor=#d6d6d6
| 318344 ||  || — || October 9, 2004 || Kitt Peak || Spacewatch || VER || align=right | 3.5 km || 
|-id=345 bgcolor=#d6d6d6
| 318345 ||  || — || October 9, 2004 || Kitt Peak || Spacewatch || — || align=right | 4.6 km || 
|-id=346 bgcolor=#d6d6d6
| 318346 ||  || — || October 9, 2004 || Kitt Peak || Spacewatch || — || align=right | 5.0 km || 
|-id=347 bgcolor=#d6d6d6
| 318347 ||  || — || October 8, 2004 || Anderson Mesa || LONEOS || THM || align=right | 2.8 km || 
|-id=348 bgcolor=#d6d6d6
| 318348 ||  || — || October 10, 2004 || Socorro || LINEAR || — || align=right | 4.3 km || 
|-id=349 bgcolor=#d6d6d6
| 318349 ||  || — || October 10, 2004 || Kitt Peak || Spacewatch || VER || align=right | 3.4 km || 
|-id=350 bgcolor=#d6d6d6
| 318350 ||  || — || October 10, 2004 || Socorro || LINEAR || — || align=right | 3.3 km || 
|-id=351 bgcolor=#d6d6d6
| 318351 ||  || — || October 11, 2004 || Kitt Peak || Spacewatch || — || align=right | 4.7 km || 
|-id=352 bgcolor=#E9E9E9
| 318352 ||  || — || October 11, 2004 || Kitt Peak || Spacewatch || — || align=right | 2.0 km || 
|-id=353 bgcolor=#E9E9E9
| 318353 ||  || — || October 11, 2004 || Kitt Peak || Spacewatch || — || align=right | 3.0 km || 
|-id=354 bgcolor=#fefefe
| 318354 ||  || — || October 11, 2004 || Kitt Peak || Spacewatch || — || align=right data-sort-value="0.68" | 680 m || 
|-id=355 bgcolor=#d6d6d6
| 318355 ||  || — || October 15, 2004 || Kitt Peak || Spacewatch || URS || align=right | 3.3 km || 
|-id=356 bgcolor=#d6d6d6
| 318356 ||  || — || October 9, 2004 || Kitt Peak || Spacewatch || — || align=right | 4.4 km || 
|-id=357 bgcolor=#d6d6d6
| 318357 ||  || — || October 12, 2004 || Kitt Peak || Spacewatch || — || align=right | 2.8 km || 
|-id=358 bgcolor=#d6d6d6
| 318358 ||  || — || October 15, 2004 || Kitt Peak || Spacewatch || — || align=right | 5.1 km || 
|-id=359 bgcolor=#d6d6d6
| 318359 ||  || — || October 9, 2004 || Socorro || LINEAR || — || align=right | 3.6 km || 
|-id=360 bgcolor=#fefefe
| 318360 ||  || — || October 11, 2004 || Kitt Peak || M. W. Buie || FLO || align=right data-sort-value="0.59" | 590 m || 
|-id=361 bgcolor=#E9E9E9
| 318361 ||  || — || October 7, 2004 || Socorro || LINEAR || — || align=right | 3.3 km || 
|-id=362 bgcolor=#d6d6d6
| 318362 ||  || — || October 10, 2004 || Kitt Peak || Spacewatch || EOS || align=right | 2.2 km || 
|-id=363 bgcolor=#d6d6d6
| 318363 ||  || — || October 19, 2004 || Drebach || G. Lehmann || HYG || align=right | 3.3 km || 
|-id=364 bgcolor=#E9E9E9
| 318364 ||  || — || October 20, 2004 || Socorro || LINEAR || — || align=right | 3.3 km || 
|-id=365 bgcolor=#d6d6d6
| 318365 ||  || — || November 3, 2004 || Kitt Peak || Spacewatch || EOS || align=right | 2.4 km || 
|-id=366 bgcolor=#fefefe
| 318366 ||  || — || November 3, 2004 || Kitt Peak || Spacewatch || MAS || align=right data-sort-value="0.97" | 970 m || 
|-id=367 bgcolor=#fefefe
| 318367 ||  || — || November 4, 2004 || Kitt Peak || Spacewatch || — || align=right | 1.1 km || 
|-id=368 bgcolor=#d6d6d6
| 318368 ||  || — || November 3, 2004 || Kitt Peak || Spacewatch || — || align=right | 3.7 km || 
|-id=369 bgcolor=#d6d6d6
| 318369 ||  || — || November 4, 2004 || Kitt Peak || Spacewatch || — || align=right | 4.0 km || 
|-id=370 bgcolor=#d6d6d6
| 318370 ||  || — || November 4, 2004 || Kitt Peak || Spacewatch || URS || align=right | 4.6 km || 
|-id=371 bgcolor=#fefefe
| 318371 ||  || — || November 4, 2004 || Kitt Peak || Spacewatch || — || align=right data-sort-value="0.60" | 600 m || 
|-id=372 bgcolor=#E9E9E9
| 318372 ||  || — || November 7, 2004 || Socorro || LINEAR || — || align=right | 2.8 km || 
|-id=373 bgcolor=#E9E9E9
| 318373 ||  || — || November 9, 2004 || Catalina || CSS || — || align=right | 1.9 km || 
|-id=374 bgcolor=#E9E9E9
| 318374 ||  || — || November 10, 2004 || Kitt Peak || Spacewatch || — || align=right | 1.3 km || 
|-id=375 bgcolor=#d6d6d6
| 318375 ||  || — || November 9, 2004 || Catalina || CSS || — || align=right | 4.4 km || 
|-id=376 bgcolor=#d6d6d6
| 318376 ||  || — || November 12, 2004 || Catalina || CSS || HYG || align=right | 3.6 km || 
|-id=377 bgcolor=#d6d6d6
| 318377 ||  || — || November 12, 2004 || Catalina || CSS || — || align=right | 4.5 km || 
|-id=378 bgcolor=#d6d6d6
| 318378 ||  || — || November 10, 2004 || Kitt Peak || Spacewatch || — || align=right | 3.4 km || 
|-id=379 bgcolor=#E9E9E9
| 318379 ||  || — || November 9, 2004 || Mauna Kea || C. Veillet || — || align=right data-sort-value="0.91" | 910 m || 
|-id=380 bgcolor=#d6d6d6
| 318380 ||  || — || November 9, 2004 || Mauna Kea || C. Veillet || — || align=right | 3.7 km || 
|-id=381 bgcolor=#d6d6d6
| 318381 ||  || — || November 19, 2004 || Socorro || LINEAR || EOS || align=right | 2.6 km || 
|-id=382 bgcolor=#fefefe
| 318382 ||  || — || November 19, 2004 || Catalina || CSS || MAS || align=right data-sort-value="0.95" | 950 m || 
|-id=383 bgcolor=#fefefe
| 318383 ||  || — || November 20, 2004 || Kitt Peak || Spacewatch || — || align=right data-sort-value="0.77" | 770 m || 
|-id=384 bgcolor=#E9E9E9
| 318384 ||  || — || December 2, 2004 || Palomar || NEAT || — || align=right | 2.0 km || 
|-id=385 bgcolor=#fefefe
| 318385 ||  || — || December 2, 2004 || Socorro || LINEAR || PHO || align=right | 2.0 km || 
|-id=386 bgcolor=#fefefe
| 318386 ||  || — || December 8, 2004 || Socorro || LINEAR || — || align=right | 1.2 km || 
|-id=387 bgcolor=#fefefe
| 318387 ||  || — || December 10, 2004 || Anderson Mesa || LONEOS || — || align=right data-sort-value="0.79" | 790 m || 
|-id=388 bgcolor=#E9E9E9
| 318388 ||  || — || December 10, 2004 || Campo Imperatore || CINEOS || fast? || align=right | 1.2 km || 
|-id=389 bgcolor=#d6d6d6
| 318389 ||  || — || December 10, 2004 || Socorro || LINEAR || EOS || align=right | 5.3 km || 
|-id=390 bgcolor=#fefefe
| 318390 ||  || — || December 11, 2004 || Kitt Peak || Spacewatch || — || align=right data-sort-value="0.73" | 730 m || 
|-id=391 bgcolor=#E9E9E9
| 318391 ||  || — || December 11, 2004 || Kitt Peak || Spacewatch || — || align=right | 1.9 km || 
|-id=392 bgcolor=#d6d6d6
| 318392 ||  || — || December 8, 2004 || Needville || Needville Obs. || — || align=right | 5.2 km || 
|-id=393 bgcolor=#E9E9E9
| 318393 ||  || — || December 10, 2004 || Kitt Peak || Spacewatch || — || align=right | 1.7 km || 
|-id=394 bgcolor=#d6d6d6
| 318394 ||  || — || December 2, 2004 || Palomar || NEAT || EOS || align=right | 3.2 km || 
|-id=395 bgcolor=#d6d6d6
| 318395 ||  || — || December 3, 2004 || Kitt Peak || Spacewatch || 7:4 || align=right | 5.6 km || 
|-id=396 bgcolor=#fefefe
| 318396 ||  || — || December 10, 2004 || Socorro || LINEAR || — || align=right data-sort-value="0.74" | 740 m || 
|-id=397 bgcolor=#E9E9E9
| 318397 ||  || — || December 11, 2004 || Kitt Peak || Spacewatch || — || align=right | 1.6 km || 
|-id=398 bgcolor=#E9E9E9
| 318398 ||  || — || December 11, 2004 || Socorro || LINEAR || — || align=right | 1.4 km || 
|-id=399 bgcolor=#E9E9E9
| 318399 ||  || — || December 11, 2004 || Kitt Peak || Spacewatch || — || align=right | 1.6 km || 
|-id=400 bgcolor=#fefefe
| 318400 ||  || — || December 13, 2004 || Anderson Mesa || LONEOS || — || align=right | 1.0 km || 
|}

318401–318500 

|-bgcolor=#fefefe
| 318401 ||  || — || December 15, 2004 || Socorro || LINEAR || — || align=right data-sort-value="0.74" | 740 m || 
|-id=402 bgcolor=#fefefe
| 318402 ||  || — || December 15, 2004 || Kitt Peak || Spacewatch || — || align=right data-sort-value="0.83" | 830 m || 
|-id=403 bgcolor=#fefefe
| 318403 ||  || — || December 2, 2004 || Catalina || CSS || — || align=right | 2.0 km || 
|-id=404 bgcolor=#d6d6d6
| 318404 ||  || — || December 3, 2004 || Kitt Peak || Spacewatch || — || align=right | 5.9 km || 
|-id=405 bgcolor=#C2FFFF
| 318405 ||  || — || December 11, 2004 || Kitt Peak || Spacewatch || L5 || align=right | 13 km || 
|-id=406 bgcolor=#fefefe
| 318406 ||  || — || December 18, 2004 || Mount Lemmon || Mount Lemmon Survey || — || align=right data-sort-value="0.59" | 590 m || 
|-id=407 bgcolor=#C2FFFF
| 318407 ||  || — || December 18, 2004 || Mount Lemmon || Mount Lemmon Survey || L5 || align=right | 9.3 km || 
|-id=408 bgcolor=#fefefe
| 318408 ||  || — || January 6, 2005 || Catalina || CSS || — || align=right | 1.2 km || 
|-id=409 bgcolor=#fefefe
| 318409 ||  || — || January 6, 2005 || Catalina || CSS || — || align=right data-sort-value="0.92" | 920 m || 
|-id=410 bgcolor=#fefefe
| 318410 ||  || — || January 6, 2005 || Catalina || CSS || — || align=right | 1.2 km || 
|-id=411 bgcolor=#FFC2E0
| 318411 ||  || — || January 7, 2005 || Catalina || CSS || APO +1km || align=right | 1.3 km || 
|-id=412 bgcolor=#E9E9E9
| 318412 Tramelan ||  ||  || January 11, 2005 || Vicques || M. Ory || — || align=right | 2.5 km || 
|-id=413 bgcolor=#fefefe
| 318413 ||  || — || January 14, 2005 || Kvistaberg || UDAS || — || align=right data-sort-value="0.85" | 850 m || 
|-id=414 bgcolor=#d6d6d6
| 318414 ||  || — || January 15, 2005 || Socorro || LINEAR || — || align=right | 2.9 km || 
|-id=415 bgcolor=#fefefe
| 318415 ||  || — || January 15, 2005 || Catalina || CSS || — || align=right data-sort-value="0.90" | 900 m || 
|-id=416 bgcolor=#fefefe
| 318416 ||  || — || January 13, 2005 || Kitt Peak || Spacewatch || — || align=right data-sort-value="0.85" | 850 m || 
|-id=417 bgcolor=#d6d6d6
| 318417 ||  || — || January 13, 2005 || Kitt Peak || Spacewatch || — || align=right | 4.3 km || 
|-id=418 bgcolor=#d6d6d6
| 318418 ||  || — || January 13, 2005 || Socorro || LINEAR || 7:4 || align=right | 3.7 km || 
|-id=419 bgcolor=#E9E9E9
| 318419 ||  || — || January 15, 2005 || Kitt Peak || Spacewatch || — || align=right | 1.7 km || 
|-id=420 bgcolor=#fefefe
| 318420 ||  || — || January 16, 2005 || Kitt Peak || Spacewatch || — || align=right data-sort-value="0.68" | 680 m || 
|-id=421 bgcolor=#E9E9E9
| 318421 ||  || — || January 17, 2005 || Kitt Peak || Spacewatch || — || align=right | 2.9 km || 
|-id=422 bgcolor=#E9E9E9
| 318422 ||  || — || January 16, 2005 || Kitt Peak || Spacewatch || MIS || align=right | 2.7 km || 
|-id=423 bgcolor=#E9E9E9
| 318423 ||  || — || January 16, 2005 || Kitt Peak || Spacewatch || — || align=right | 2.2 km || 
|-id=424 bgcolor=#fefefe
| 318424 ||  || — || January 16, 2005 || Socorro || LINEAR || — || align=right | 1.1 km || 
|-id=425 bgcolor=#E9E9E9
| 318425 ||  || — || January 16, 2005 || Kitt Peak || Spacewatch || — || align=right | 2.6 km || 
|-id=426 bgcolor=#fefefe
| 318426 ||  || — || January 17, 2005 || Kitt Peak || Spacewatch || — || align=right data-sort-value="0.81" | 810 m || 
|-id=427 bgcolor=#fefefe
| 318427 ||  || — || January 31, 2005 || Palomar || NEAT || — || align=right data-sort-value="0.95" | 950 m || 
|-id=428 bgcolor=#E9E9E9
| 318428 ||  || — || January 16, 2005 || Mauna Kea || C. Veillet || — || align=right data-sort-value="0.91" | 910 m || 
|-id=429 bgcolor=#fefefe
| 318429 ||  || — || February 1, 2005 || Kitt Peak || Spacewatch || — || align=right data-sort-value="0.92" | 920 m || 
|-id=430 bgcolor=#E9E9E9
| 318430 ||  || — || February 1, 2005 || Kitt Peak || Spacewatch || — || align=right | 1.9 km || 
|-id=431 bgcolor=#d6d6d6
| 318431 ||  || — || February 1, 2005 || Kitt Peak || Spacewatch || LUT || align=right | 6.3 km || 
|-id=432 bgcolor=#fefefe
| 318432 ||  || — || February 1, 2005 || Kitt Peak || Spacewatch || H || align=right | 1.1 km || 
|-id=433 bgcolor=#E9E9E9
| 318433 ||  || — || February 1, 2005 || Catalina || CSS || — || align=right | 1.5 km || 
|-id=434 bgcolor=#E9E9E9
| 318434 ||  || — || February 2, 2005 || Kitt Peak || Spacewatch || — || align=right | 3.1 km || 
|-id=435 bgcolor=#fefefe
| 318435 ||  || — || February 2, 2005 || Socorro || LINEAR || — || align=right data-sort-value="0.61" | 610 m || 
|-id=436 bgcolor=#fefefe
| 318436 ||  || — || February 1, 2005 || Catalina || CSS || — || align=right | 1.3 km || 
|-id=437 bgcolor=#fefefe
| 318437 ||  || — || February 2, 2005 || Kitt Peak || Spacewatch || — || align=right data-sort-value="0.98" | 980 m || 
|-id=438 bgcolor=#fefefe
| 318438 ||  || — || February 3, 2005 || Socorro || LINEAR || H || align=right | 1.1 km || 
|-id=439 bgcolor=#E9E9E9
| 318439 ||  || — || February 2, 2005 || Kitt Peak || Spacewatch || — || align=right | 1.4 km || 
|-id=440 bgcolor=#fefefe
| 318440 ||  || — || February 2, 2005 || Catalina || CSS || — || align=right | 1.0 km || 
|-id=441 bgcolor=#fefefe
| 318441 ||  || — || February 2, 2005 || Kitt Peak || Spacewatch || — || align=right | 1.1 km || 
|-id=442 bgcolor=#E9E9E9
| 318442 ||  || — || February 2, 2005 || Kitt Peak || Spacewatch || — || align=right data-sort-value="0.88" | 880 m || 
|-id=443 bgcolor=#E9E9E9
| 318443 ||  || — || February 3, 2005 || Socorro || LINEAR || — || align=right | 1.5 km || 
|-id=444 bgcolor=#fefefe
| 318444 ||  || — || February 3, 2005 || Socorro || LINEAR || — || align=right data-sort-value="0.91" | 910 m || 
|-id=445 bgcolor=#fefefe
| 318445 ||  || — || February 3, 2005 || Socorro || LINEAR || — || align=right data-sort-value="0.90" | 900 m || 
|-id=446 bgcolor=#fefefe
| 318446 ||  || — || February 9, 2005 || Anderson Mesa || LONEOS || FLO || align=right data-sort-value="0.74" | 740 m || 
|-id=447 bgcolor=#E9E9E9
| 318447 ||  || — || February 1, 2005 || Kitt Peak || Spacewatch || — || align=right | 3.0 km || 
|-id=448 bgcolor=#E9E9E9
| 318448 ||  || — || February 1, 2005 || Kitt Peak || Spacewatch || — || align=right | 1.0 km || 
|-id=449 bgcolor=#E9E9E9
| 318449 ||  || — || February 1, 2005 || Kitt Peak || Spacewatch || — || align=right | 1.9 km || 
|-id=450 bgcolor=#FFC2E0
| 318450 ||  || — || March 1, 2005 || Socorro || LINEAR || AMO || align=right data-sort-value="0.37" | 370 m || 
|-id=451 bgcolor=#fefefe
| 318451 ||  || — || March 2, 2005 || Altschwendt || W. Ries || — || align=right | 1.6 km || 
|-id=452 bgcolor=#fefefe
| 318452 ||  || — || January 19, 2005 || Kitt Peak || Spacewatch || FLO || align=right data-sort-value="0.60" | 600 m || 
|-id=453 bgcolor=#fefefe
| 318453 ||  || — || March 1, 2005 || Kitt Peak || Spacewatch || — || align=right | 1.0 km || 
|-id=454 bgcolor=#fefefe
| 318454 ||  || — || March 1, 2005 || Kitt Peak || Spacewatch || ERI || align=right | 1.8 km || 
|-id=455 bgcolor=#d6d6d6
| 318455 ||  || — || March 2, 2005 || Kitt Peak || Spacewatch || — || align=right | 3.3 km || 
|-id=456 bgcolor=#fefefe
| 318456 ||  || — || March 2, 2005 || Kitt Peak || Spacewatch || NYS || align=right data-sort-value="0.69" | 690 m || 
|-id=457 bgcolor=#fefefe
| 318457 ||  || — || January 7, 2005 || Catalina || CSS || — || align=right data-sort-value="0.98" | 980 m || 
|-id=458 bgcolor=#fefefe
| 318458 ||  || — || March 3, 2005 || Kitt Peak || Spacewatch || MAS || align=right data-sort-value="0.80" | 800 m || 
|-id=459 bgcolor=#fefefe
| 318459 ||  || — || March 3, 2005 || Catalina || CSS || NYS || align=right data-sort-value="0.90" | 900 m || 
|-id=460 bgcolor=#fefefe
| 318460 ||  || — || March 3, 2005 || Catalina || CSS || V || align=right data-sort-value="0.88" | 880 m || 
|-id=461 bgcolor=#fefefe
| 318461 ||  || — || March 3, 2005 || Catalina || CSS || FLO || align=right data-sort-value="0.76" | 760 m || 
|-id=462 bgcolor=#fefefe
| 318462 ||  || — || March 3, 2005 || Catalina || CSS || FLO || align=right data-sort-value="0.93" | 930 m || 
|-id=463 bgcolor=#fefefe
| 318463 ||  || — || March 3, 2005 || Catalina || CSS || NYS || align=right data-sort-value="0.68" | 680 m || 
|-id=464 bgcolor=#fefefe
| 318464 ||  || — || March 3, 2005 || Catalina || CSS || V || align=right data-sort-value="0.71" | 710 m || 
|-id=465 bgcolor=#fefefe
| 318465 ||  || — || March 4, 2005 || Socorro || LINEAR || — || align=right | 1.1 km || 
|-id=466 bgcolor=#fefefe
| 318466 ||  || — || March 1, 2005 || Kitt Peak || Spacewatch || — || align=right data-sort-value="0.95" | 950 m || 
|-id=467 bgcolor=#fefefe
| 318467 ||  || — || March 1, 2005 || Kitt Peak || Spacewatch || — || align=right data-sort-value="0.97" | 970 m || 
|-id=468 bgcolor=#E9E9E9
| 318468 ||  || — || March 3, 2005 || Catalina || CSS || — || align=right | 2.7 km || 
|-id=469 bgcolor=#fefefe
| 318469 ||  || — || March 3, 2005 || Jarnac || Jarnac Obs. || FLO || align=right data-sort-value="0.67" | 670 m || 
|-id=470 bgcolor=#fefefe
| 318470 ||  || — || March 3, 2005 || Catalina || CSS || NYS || align=right data-sort-value="0.63" | 630 m || 
|-id=471 bgcolor=#fefefe
| 318471 ||  || — || March 4, 2005 || Kitt Peak || Spacewatch || NYS || align=right data-sort-value="0.73" | 730 m || 
|-id=472 bgcolor=#fefefe
| 318472 ||  || — || March 4, 2005 || Kitt Peak || Spacewatch || — || align=right data-sort-value="0.85" | 850 m || 
|-id=473 bgcolor=#fefefe
| 318473 ||  || — || March 4, 2005 || Kitt Peak || Spacewatch || NYS || align=right data-sort-value="0.67" | 670 m || 
|-id=474 bgcolor=#E9E9E9
| 318474 ||  || — || March 4, 2005 || Mount Lemmon || Mount Lemmon Survey || — || align=right | 1.9 km || 
|-id=475 bgcolor=#fefefe
| 318475 ||  || — || March 7, 2005 || Socorro || LINEAR || V || align=right data-sort-value="0.79" | 790 m || 
|-id=476 bgcolor=#fefefe
| 318476 ||  || — || March 7, 2005 || Socorro || LINEAR || H || align=right data-sort-value="0.71" | 710 m || 
|-id=477 bgcolor=#fefefe
| 318477 ||  || — || November 18, 2003 || Kitt Peak || Spacewatch || — || align=right | 1.3 km || 
|-id=478 bgcolor=#fefefe
| 318478 ||  || — || March 3, 2005 || Kitt Peak || Spacewatch || V || align=right data-sort-value="0.73" | 730 m || 
|-id=479 bgcolor=#d6d6d6
| 318479 ||  || — || March 3, 2005 || Kitt Peak || Spacewatch || 3:2 || align=right | 4.7 km || 
|-id=480 bgcolor=#fefefe
| 318480 ||  || — || March 4, 2005 || Mount Lemmon || Mount Lemmon Survey || MAS || align=right data-sort-value="0.73" | 730 m || 
|-id=481 bgcolor=#fefefe
| 318481 ||  || — || March 8, 2005 || Kitt Peak || Spacewatch || NYS || align=right data-sort-value="0.82" | 820 m || 
|-id=482 bgcolor=#fefefe
| 318482 ||  || — || March 8, 2005 || Kitt Peak || Spacewatch || FLO || align=right data-sort-value="0.63" | 630 m || 
|-id=483 bgcolor=#E9E9E9
| 318483 ||  || — || March 1, 2005 || Kitt Peak || Spacewatch || — || align=right | 2.0 km || 
|-id=484 bgcolor=#fefefe
| 318484 ||  || — || March 3, 2005 || Catalina || CSS || FLO || align=right | 1.0 km || 
|-id=485 bgcolor=#fefefe
| 318485 ||  || — || March 3, 2005 || Catalina || CSS || — || align=right data-sort-value="0.73" | 730 m || 
|-id=486 bgcolor=#fefefe
| 318486 ||  || — || March 4, 2005 || Kitt Peak || Spacewatch || MAS || align=right data-sort-value="0.93" | 930 m || 
|-id=487 bgcolor=#fefefe
| 318487 ||  || — || March 4, 2005 || Socorro || LINEAR || NYS || align=right data-sort-value="0.72" | 720 m || 
|-id=488 bgcolor=#E9E9E9
| 318488 ||  || — || March 4, 2005 || Mount Lemmon || Mount Lemmon Survey || AST || align=right | 1.9 km || 
|-id=489 bgcolor=#E9E9E9
| 318489 ||  || — || March 4, 2005 || Mount Lemmon || Mount Lemmon Survey || — || align=right data-sort-value="0.99" | 990 m || 
|-id=490 bgcolor=#fefefe
| 318490 ||  || — || March 7, 2005 || Socorro || LINEAR || — || align=right data-sort-value="0.98" | 980 m || 
|-id=491 bgcolor=#fefefe
| 318491 ||  || — || March 8, 2005 || Kitt Peak || Spacewatch || — || align=right data-sort-value="0.94" | 940 m || 
|-id=492 bgcolor=#fefefe
| 318492 ||  || — || March 8, 2005 || Kitt Peak || Spacewatch || — || align=right data-sort-value="0.95" | 950 m || 
|-id=493 bgcolor=#fefefe
| 318493 ||  || — || March 8, 2005 || Socorro || LINEAR || FLO || align=right data-sort-value="0.81" | 810 m || 
|-id=494 bgcolor=#E9E9E9
| 318494 ||  || — || March 9, 2005 || Kitt Peak || Spacewatch || — || align=right data-sort-value="0.83" | 830 m || 
|-id=495 bgcolor=#fefefe
| 318495 ||  || — || March 9, 2005 || Anderson Mesa || LONEOS || — || align=right data-sort-value="0.81" | 810 m || 
|-id=496 bgcolor=#fefefe
| 318496 ||  || — || March 9, 2005 || Anderson Mesa || LONEOS || PHO || align=right | 1.2 km || 
|-id=497 bgcolor=#E9E9E9
| 318497 ||  || — || March 9, 2005 || Socorro || LINEAR || — || align=right | 1.5 km || 
|-id=498 bgcolor=#fefefe
| 318498 ||  || — || March 9, 2005 || Mount Lemmon || Mount Lemmon Survey || — || align=right data-sort-value="0.90" | 900 m || 
|-id=499 bgcolor=#fefefe
| 318499 ||  || — || March 10, 2005 || Mount Lemmon || Mount Lemmon Survey || — || align=right data-sort-value="0.78" | 780 m || 
|-id=500 bgcolor=#fefefe
| 318500 ||  || — || March 10, 2005 || Mount Lemmon || Mount Lemmon Survey || — || align=right data-sort-value="0.67" | 670 m || 
|}

318501–318600 

|-bgcolor=#fefefe
| 318501 ||  || — || March 10, 2005 || Kitt Peak || Spacewatch || MAS || align=right data-sort-value="0.75" | 750 m || 
|-id=502 bgcolor=#fefefe
| 318502 ||  || — || March 10, 2005 || Kitt Peak || Spacewatch || NYS || align=right data-sort-value="0.77" | 770 m || 
|-id=503 bgcolor=#fefefe
| 318503 ||  || — || March 10, 2005 || Kitt Peak || Spacewatch || — || align=right data-sort-value="0.96" | 960 m || 
|-id=504 bgcolor=#d6d6d6
| 318504 ||  || — || March 10, 2005 || Kitt Peak || Spacewatch || — || align=right | 3.4 km || 
|-id=505 bgcolor=#fefefe
| 318505 ||  || — || March 8, 2005 || Mount Lemmon || Mount Lemmon Survey || — || align=right data-sort-value="0.90" | 900 m || 
|-id=506 bgcolor=#fefefe
| 318506 ||  || — || March 8, 2005 || Mount Lemmon || Mount Lemmon Survey || MAS || align=right | 1.1 km || 
|-id=507 bgcolor=#fefefe
| 318507 ||  || — || March 9, 2005 || Catalina || CSS || — || align=right | 1.1 km || 
|-id=508 bgcolor=#fefefe
| 318508 ||  || — || March 9, 2005 || Mount Lemmon || Mount Lemmon Survey || MAS || align=right data-sort-value="0.65" | 650 m || 
|-id=509 bgcolor=#fefefe
| 318509 ||  || — || March 9, 2005 || Mount Lemmon || Mount Lemmon Survey || FLO || align=right data-sort-value="0.77" | 770 m || 
|-id=510 bgcolor=#fefefe
| 318510 ||  || — || March 11, 2005 || Mount Lemmon || Mount Lemmon Survey || NYS || align=right data-sort-value="0.64" | 640 m || 
|-id=511 bgcolor=#fefefe
| 318511 ||  || — || March 7, 2005 || Socorro || LINEAR || — || align=right | 1.2 km || 
|-id=512 bgcolor=#fefefe
| 318512 ||  || — || March 8, 2005 || Anderson Mesa || LONEOS || — || align=right data-sort-value="0.94" | 940 m || 
|-id=513 bgcolor=#fefefe
| 318513 ||  || — || March 8, 2005 || Mount Lemmon || Mount Lemmon Survey || V || align=right data-sort-value="0.69" | 690 m || 
|-id=514 bgcolor=#fefefe
| 318514 ||  || — || March 9, 2005 || Kitt Peak || Spacewatch || — || align=right data-sort-value="0.73" | 730 m || 
|-id=515 bgcolor=#fefefe
| 318515 ||  || — || March 9, 2005 || Mount Lemmon || Mount Lemmon Survey || — || align=right | 1.1 km || 
|-id=516 bgcolor=#fefefe
| 318516 ||  || — || March 10, 2005 || Mount Lemmon || Mount Lemmon Survey || NYS || align=right data-sort-value="0.64" | 640 m || 
|-id=517 bgcolor=#fefefe
| 318517 ||  || — || March 10, 2005 || Mount Lemmon || Mount Lemmon Survey || PHO || align=right | 1.6 km || 
|-id=518 bgcolor=#fefefe
| 318518 ||  || — || March 11, 2005 || Mount Lemmon || Mount Lemmon Survey || — || align=right data-sort-value="0.91" | 910 m || 
|-id=519 bgcolor=#fefefe
| 318519 ||  || — || March 11, 2005 || Mount Lemmon || Mount Lemmon Survey || — || align=right data-sort-value="0.96" | 960 m || 
|-id=520 bgcolor=#fefefe
| 318520 ||  || — || March 10, 2005 || Mount Lemmon || Mount Lemmon Survey || — || align=right | 1.0 km || 
|-id=521 bgcolor=#fefefe
| 318521 ||  || — || March 10, 2005 || Mount Lemmon || Mount Lemmon Survey || V || align=right data-sort-value="0.81" | 810 m || 
|-id=522 bgcolor=#fefefe
| 318522 ||  || — || March 10, 2005 || Mount Lemmon || Mount Lemmon Survey || NYS || align=right data-sort-value="0.64" | 640 m || 
|-id=523 bgcolor=#E9E9E9
| 318523 ||  || — || March 10, 2005 || Siding Spring || SSS || — || align=right | 2.5 km || 
|-id=524 bgcolor=#fefefe
| 318524 ||  || — || March 9, 2005 || Mount Lemmon || Mount Lemmon Survey || FLO || align=right data-sort-value="0.77" | 770 m || 
|-id=525 bgcolor=#fefefe
| 318525 ||  || — || March 10, 2005 || Anderson Mesa || LONEOS || — || align=right | 1.0 km || 
|-id=526 bgcolor=#fefefe
| 318526 ||  || — || March 11, 2005 || Catalina || CSS || — || align=right data-sort-value="0.97" | 970 m || 
|-id=527 bgcolor=#fefefe
| 318527 ||  || — || March 12, 2005 || Kitt Peak || Spacewatch || NYS || align=right data-sort-value="0.68" | 680 m || 
|-id=528 bgcolor=#fefefe
| 318528 ||  || — || March 12, 2005 || Kitt Peak || Spacewatch || EUT || align=right data-sort-value="0.81" | 810 m || 
|-id=529 bgcolor=#d6d6d6
| 318529 ||  || — || March 12, 2005 || Kitt Peak || Spacewatch || — || align=right | 2.9 km || 
|-id=530 bgcolor=#fefefe
| 318530 ||  || — || March 13, 2005 || Anderson Mesa || LONEOS || H || align=right | 1.00 km || 
|-id=531 bgcolor=#fefefe
| 318531 ||  || — || March 9, 2005 || Socorro || LINEAR || — || align=right | 1.1 km || 
|-id=532 bgcolor=#fefefe
| 318532 ||  || — || September 27, 2003 || Kitt Peak || Spacewatch || NYS || align=right data-sort-value="0.63" | 630 m || 
|-id=533 bgcolor=#E9E9E9
| 318533 ||  || — || March 14, 2005 || Mount Lemmon || Mount Lemmon Survey || AGN || align=right | 1.6 km || 
|-id=534 bgcolor=#fefefe
| 318534 ||  || — || March 11, 2005 || Kitt Peak || Spacewatch || — || align=right data-sort-value="0.89" | 890 m || 
|-id=535 bgcolor=#fefefe
| 318535 ||  || — || March 11, 2005 || Kitt Peak || Spacewatch || — || align=right data-sort-value="0.93" | 930 m || 
|-id=536 bgcolor=#E9E9E9
| 318536 ||  || — || March 1, 2005 || Catalina || CSS || — || align=right | 2.6 km || 
|-id=537 bgcolor=#d6d6d6
| 318537 ||  || — || March 31, 2005 || Siding Spring || Siding Spring Obs. || TIR || align=right | 2.8 km || 
|-id=538 bgcolor=#fefefe
| 318538 ||  || — || March 31, 2005 || Palomar || NEAT || — || align=right | 1.5 km || 
|-id=539 bgcolor=#fefefe
| 318539 ||  || — || March 30, 2005 || Catalina || CSS || — || align=right data-sort-value="0.99" | 990 m || 
|-id=540 bgcolor=#fefefe
| 318540 ||  || — || April 1, 2005 || Anderson Mesa || LONEOS || — || align=right | 1.0 km || 
|-id=541 bgcolor=#fefefe
| 318541 ||  || — || April 1, 2005 || Kitt Peak || Spacewatch || — || align=right data-sort-value="0.80" | 800 m || 
|-id=542 bgcolor=#fefefe
| 318542 ||  || — || April 1, 2005 || Kitt Peak || Spacewatch || ERI || align=right | 1.9 km || 
|-id=543 bgcolor=#fefefe
| 318543 ||  || — || April 1, 2005 || Kitt Peak || Spacewatch || NYS || align=right data-sort-value="0.74" | 740 m || 
|-id=544 bgcolor=#fefefe
| 318544 ||  || — || April 1, 2005 || Kitt Peak || Spacewatch || ERI || align=right | 2.0 km || 
|-id=545 bgcolor=#fefefe
| 318545 ||  || — || April 1, 2005 || Kitt Peak || Spacewatch || NYS || align=right data-sort-value="0.63" | 630 m || 
|-id=546 bgcolor=#fefefe
| 318546 ||  || — || April 1, 2005 || Kitt Peak || Spacewatch || — || align=right data-sort-value="0.85" | 850 m || 
|-id=547 bgcolor=#fefefe
| 318547 Fidrich ||  ||  || April 2, 2005 || Piszkéstető || K. Sárneczky || NYS || align=right data-sort-value="0.60" | 600 m || 
|-id=548 bgcolor=#fefefe
| 318548 ||  || — || April 2, 2005 || Mount Lemmon || Mount Lemmon Survey || MAS || align=right data-sort-value="0.66" | 660 m || 
|-id=549 bgcolor=#E9E9E9
| 318549 ||  || — || April 2, 2005 || Mount Lemmon || Mount Lemmon Survey || — || align=right | 1.8 km || 
|-id=550 bgcolor=#fefefe
| 318550 ||  || — || April 3, 2005 || Palomar || NEAT || — || align=right | 1.2 km || 
|-id=551 bgcolor=#E9E9E9
| 318551 ||  || — || April 2, 2005 || Siding Spring || SSS || — || align=right | 2.6 km || 
|-id=552 bgcolor=#fefefe
| 318552 ||  || — || April 4, 2005 || Mount Lemmon || Mount Lemmon Survey || — || align=right data-sort-value="0.75" | 750 m || 
|-id=553 bgcolor=#E9E9E9
| 318553 ||  || — || April 5, 2005 || Mount Lemmon || Mount Lemmon Survey || — || align=right | 1.9 km || 
|-id=554 bgcolor=#E9E9E9
| 318554 ||  || — || March 17, 2005 || Kitt Peak || Spacewatch || — || align=right | 2.6 km || 
|-id=555 bgcolor=#fefefe
| 318555 ||  || — || April 4, 2005 || Mount Lemmon || Mount Lemmon Survey || — || align=right data-sort-value="0.96" | 960 m || 
|-id=556 bgcolor=#fefefe
| 318556 ||  || — || April 5, 2005 || Mount Lemmon || Mount Lemmon Survey || NYS || align=right data-sort-value="0.72" | 720 m || 
|-id=557 bgcolor=#fefefe
| 318557 ||  || — || April 4, 2005 || Mount Lemmon || Mount Lemmon Survey || — || align=right data-sort-value="0.78" | 780 m || 
|-id=558 bgcolor=#fefefe
| 318558 ||  || — || April 6, 2005 || Mount Lemmon || Mount Lemmon Survey || — || align=right data-sort-value="0.75" | 750 m || 
|-id=559 bgcolor=#fefefe
| 318559 ||  || — || April 9, 2005 || Kitt Peak || Spacewatch || NYS || align=right data-sort-value="0.85" | 850 m || 
|-id=560 bgcolor=#fefefe
| 318560 ||  || — || April 9, 2005 || Mount Lemmon || Mount Lemmon Survey || — || align=right data-sort-value="0.96" | 960 m || 
|-id=561 bgcolor=#fefefe
| 318561 ||  || — || April 6, 2005 || Catalina || CSS || — || align=right | 1.1 km || 
|-id=562 bgcolor=#fefefe
| 318562 ||  || — || April 11, 2005 || Kitt Peak || Spacewatch || NYS || align=right data-sort-value="0.69" | 690 m || 
|-id=563 bgcolor=#fefefe
| 318563 ||  || — || April 11, 2005 || Kitt Peak || Spacewatch || NYS || align=right data-sort-value="0.69" | 690 m || 
|-id=564 bgcolor=#E9E9E9
| 318564 ||  || — || April 11, 2005 || Mount Lemmon || Mount Lemmon Survey || — || align=right data-sort-value="0.84" | 840 m || 
|-id=565 bgcolor=#fefefe
| 318565 ||  || — || April 11, 2005 || Mount Lemmon || Mount Lemmon Survey || NYS || align=right data-sort-value="0.68" | 680 m || 
|-id=566 bgcolor=#fefefe
| 318566 ||  || — || April 9, 2005 || Kitt Peak || Spacewatch || V || align=right data-sort-value="0.68" | 680 m || 
|-id=567 bgcolor=#fefefe
| 318567 ||  || — || April 10, 2005 || Kitt Peak || Spacewatch || — || align=right data-sort-value="0.82" | 820 m || 
|-id=568 bgcolor=#fefefe
| 318568 ||  || — || April 10, 2005 || Kitt Peak || Spacewatch || V || align=right data-sort-value="0.59" | 590 m || 
|-id=569 bgcolor=#fefefe
| 318569 ||  || — || April 10, 2005 || Mount Lemmon || Mount Lemmon Survey || NYS || align=right data-sort-value="0.65" | 650 m || 
|-id=570 bgcolor=#fefefe
| 318570 ||  || — || April 10, 2005 || Kitt Peak || Spacewatch || — || align=right data-sort-value="0.97" | 970 m || 
|-id=571 bgcolor=#E9E9E9
| 318571 ||  || — || April 12, 2005 || Kitt Peak || Spacewatch || GEF || align=right | 1.6 km || 
|-id=572 bgcolor=#FA8072
| 318572 ||  || — || April 6, 2005 || Mount Lemmon || Mount Lemmon Survey || — || align=right data-sort-value="0.68" | 680 m || 
|-id=573 bgcolor=#E9E9E9
| 318573 ||  || — || April 7, 2005 || Kitt Peak || Spacewatch || — || align=right | 2.5 km || 
|-id=574 bgcolor=#fefefe
| 318574 ||  || — || April 10, 2005 || Kitt Peak || Spacewatch || V || align=right data-sort-value="0.93" | 930 m || 
|-id=575 bgcolor=#fefefe
| 318575 ||  || — || April 11, 2005 || Kitt Peak || Spacewatch || — || align=right | 1.2 km || 
|-id=576 bgcolor=#fefefe
| 318576 ||  || — || April 11, 2005 || Kitt Peak || Spacewatch || — || align=right | 1.1 km || 
|-id=577 bgcolor=#fefefe
| 318577 ||  || — || April 11, 2005 || Kitt Peak || Spacewatch || V || align=right data-sort-value="0.80" | 800 m || 
|-id=578 bgcolor=#fefefe
| 318578 ||  || — || April 12, 2005 || Kitt Peak || Spacewatch || — || align=right data-sort-value="0.76" | 760 m || 
|-id=579 bgcolor=#E9E9E9
| 318579 ||  || — || April 10, 2005 || Mount Lemmon || Mount Lemmon Survey || — || align=right | 1.0 km || 
|-id=580 bgcolor=#FA8072
| 318580 ||  || — || April 12, 2005 || Siding Spring || SSS || — || align=right data-sort-value="0.98" | 980 m || 
|-id=581 bgcolor=#fefefe
| 318581 ||  || — || April 11, 2005 || Mount Lemmon || Mount Lemmon Survey || NYS || align=right data-sort-value="0.87" | 870 m || 
|-id=582 bgcolor=#fefefe
| 318582 ||  || — || April 12, 2005 || Anderson Mesa || LONEOS || — || align=right | 1.3 km || 
|-id=583 bgcolor=#fefefe
| 318583 ||  || — || April 12, 2005 || Kitt Peak || Spacewatch || MAS || align=right data-sort-value="0.78" | 780 m || 
|-id=584 bgcolor=#fefefe
| 318584 ||  || — || April 12, 2005 || Kitt Peak || M. W. Buie || FLO || align=right data-sort-value="0.86" | 860 m || 
|-id=585 bgcolor=#fefefe
| 318585 ||  || — || April 12, 2005 || Kitt Peak || M. W. Buie || V || align=right data-sort-value="0.65" | 650 m || 
|-id=586 bgcolor=#fefefe
| 318586 ||  || — || November 30, 2003 || Kitt Peak || Spacewatch || NYS || align=right data-sort-value="0.88" | 880 m || 
|-id=587 bgcolor=#fefefe
| 318587 ||  || — || April 5, 2005 || Mount Lemmon || Mount Lemmon Survey || V || align=right data-sort-value="0.87" | 870 m || 
|-id=588 bgcolor=#fefefe
| 318588 ||  || — || April 12, 2005 || Kitt Peak || Spacewatch || — || align=right data-sort-value="0.91" | 910 m || 
|-id=589 bgcolor=#fefefe
| 318589 ||  || — || April 3, 2005 || Palomar || NEAT || — || align=right data-sort-value="0.90" | 900 m || 
|-id=590 bgcolor=#fefefe
| 318590 ||  || — || April 16, 2005 || Kitt Peak || Spacewatch || — || align=right data-sort-value="0.90" | 900 m || 
|-id=591 bgcolor=#fefefe
| 318591 ||  || — || April 17, 2005 || Kitt Peak || Spacewatch || NYS || align=right data-sort-value="0.83" | 830 m || 
|-id=592 bgcolor=#fefefe
| 318592 ||  || — || April 16, 2005 || Cordell-Lorenz || D. T. Durig || — || align=right data-sort-value="0.87" | 870 m || 
|-id=593 bgcolor=#fefefe
| 318593 ||  || — || May 3, 2005 || Kitt Peak || Spacewatch || NYS || align=right data-sort-value="0.75" | 750 m || 
|-id=594 bgcolor=#fefefe
| 318594 ||  || — || May 3, 2005 || Catalina || CSS || — || align=right | 1.2 km || 
|-id=595 bgcolor=#fefefe
| 318595 ||  || — || May 3, 2005 || Kitt Peak || Spacewatch || MAS || align=right data-sort-value="0.88" | 880 m || 
|-id=596 bgcolor=#fefefe
| 318596 ||  || — || May 3, 2005 || Catalina || CSS || PHO || align=right | 1.6 km || 
|-id=597 bgcolor=#fefefe
| 318597 ||  || — || May 4, 2005 || Mount Lemmon || Mount Lemmon Survey || — || align=right data-sort-value="0.75" | 750 m || 
|-id=598 bgcolor=#fefefe
| 318598 ||  || — || May 7, 2005 || Mount Lemmon || Mount Lemmon Survey || NYS || align=right data-sort-value="0.71" | 710 m || 
|-id=599 bgcolor=#d6d6d6
| 318599 ||  || — || December 19, 2003 || Kitt Peak || Spacewatch || THM || align=right | 3.3 km || 
|-id=600 bgcolor=#fefefe
| 318600 ||  || — || May 8, 2005 || Anderson Mesa || LONEOS || MAS || align=right data-sort-value="0.97" | 970 m || 
|}

318601–318700 

|-bgcolor=#d6d6d6
| 318601 ||  || — || May 3, 2005 || Kitt Peak || DLS || — || align=right | 4.7 km || 
|-id=602 bgcolor=#fefefe
| 318602 ||  || — || May 3, 2005 || Kitt Peak || Spacewatch || V || align=right data-sort-value="0.74" | 740 m || 
|-id=603 bgcolor=#d6d6d6
| 318603 ||  || — || May 4, 2005 || Kitt Peak || Spacewatch || EOS || align=right | 2.6 km || 
|-id=604 bgcolor=#fefefe
| 318604 ||  || — || May 4, 2005 || Kitt Peak || Spacewatch || — || align=right | 1.1 km || 
|-id=605 bgcolor=#fefefe
| 318605 ||  || — || May 4, 2005 || Kitt Peak || Spacewatch || V || align=right data-sort-value="0.57" | 570 m || 
|-id=606 bgcolor=#d6d6d6
| 318606 ||  || — || May 4, 2005 || Kitt Peak || Spacewatch || EOS || align=right | 2.8 km || 
|-id=607 bgcolor=#E9E9E9
| 318607 ||  || — || May 7, 2005 || Kitt Peak || Spacewatch || — || align=right | 1.8 km || 
|-id=608 bgcolor=#fefefe
| 318608 ||  || — || May 7, 2005 || Catalina || CSS || — || align=right | 1.2 km || 
|-id=609 bgcolor=#d6d6d6
| 318609 ||  || — || May 3, 2005 || Catalina || CSS || EUP || align=right | 3.7 km || 
|-id=610 bgcolor=#d6d6d6
| 318610 ||  || — || May 4, 2005 || Kitt Peak || Spacewatch || — || align=right | 3.0 km || 
|-id=611 bgcolor=#d6d6d6
| 318611 ||  || — || May 4, 2005 || Kitt Peak || Spacewatch || — || align=right | 3.6 km || 
|-id=612 bgcolor=#fefefe
| 318612 ||  || — || May 4, 2005 || Palomar || NEAT || — || align=right data-sort-value="0.81" | 810 m || 
|-id=613 bgcolor=#d6d6d6
| 318613 ||  || — || May 6, 2005 || Kitt Peak || Spacewatch || — || align=right | 3.8 km || 
|-id=614 bgcolor=#d6d6d6
| 318614 ||  || — || May 8, 2005 || Kitt Peak || Spacewatch || EOS || align=right | 3.1 km || 
|-id=615 bgcolor=#fefefe
| 318615 ||  || — || May 9, 2005 || Anderson Mesa || LONEOS || NYS || align=right data-sort-value="0.72" | 720 m || 
|-id=616 bgcolor=#fefefe
| 318616 ||  || — || May 10, 2005 || Mount Lemmon || Mount Lemmon Survey || — || align=right data-sort-value="0.98" | 980 m || 
|-id=617 bgcolor=#fefefe
| 318617 ||  || — || May 7, 2005 || Mount Lemmon || Mount Lemmon Survey || MAS || align=right data-sort-value="0.78" | 780 m || 
|-id=618 bgcolor=#d6d6d6
| 318618 ||  || — || May 11, 2005 || Palomar || NEAT || — || align=right | 4.6 km || 
|-id=619 bgcolor=#fefefe
| 318619 ||  || — || May 9, 2005 || Catalina || CSS || — || align=right | 1.1 km || 
|-id=620 bgcolor=#fefefe
| 318620 ||  || — || May 8, 2005 || Mount Lemmon || Mount Lemmon Survey || NYS || align=right data-sort-value="0.72" | 720 m || 
|-id=621 bgcolor=#d6d6d6
| 318621 ||  || — || May 10, 2005 || Kitt Peak || Spacewatch || — || align=right | 4.2 km || 
|-id=622 bgcolor=#d6d6d6
| 318622 ||  || — || May 13, 2005 || Kitt Peak || Spacewatch || — || align=right | 3.6 km || 
|-id=623 bgcolor=#fefefe
| 318623 ||  || — || May 13, 2005 || Kitt Peak || Spacewatch || NYS || align=right data-sort-value="0.56" | 560 m || 
|-id=624 bgcolor=#fefefe
| 318624 ||  || — || May 13, 2005 || Kitt Peak || Spacewatch || — || align=right | 1.1 km || 
|-id=625 bgcolor=#d6d6d6
| 318625 ||  || — || May 15, 2005 || Palomar || NEAT || — || align=right | 5.3 km || 
|-id=626 bgcolor=#d6d6d6
| 318626 ||  || — || May 10, 2005 || Mount Lemmon || Mount Lemmon Survey || KOR || align=right | 1.4 km || 
|-id=627 bgcolor=#fefefe
| 318627 ||  || — || May 9, 2005 || Socorro || LINEAR || — || align=right data-sort-value="0.84" | 840 m || 
|-id=628 bgcolor=#fefefe
| 318628 ||  || — || May 11, 2005 || Palomar || NEAT || — || align=right data-sort-value="0.77" | 770 m || 
|-id=629 bgcolor=#fefefe
| 318629 ||  || — || May 14, 2005 || Kitt Peak || Spacewatch || V || align=right data-sort-value="0.72" | 720 m || 
|-id=630 bgcolor=#d6d6d6
| 318630 ||  || — || May 16, 2005 || Mount Lemmon || Mount Lemmon Survey || — || align=right | 3.6 km || 
|-id=631 bgcolor=#fefefe
| 318631 ||  || — || May 18, 2005 || Palomar || NEAT || MAS || align=right data-sort-value="0.80" | 800 m || 
|-id=632 bgcolor=#fefefe
| 318632 ||  || — || May 18, 2005 || Siding Spring || SSS || — || align=right | 1.1 km || 
|-id=633 bgcolor=#fefefe
| 318633 ||  || — || June 1, 2005 || Kitt Peak || Spacewatch || — || align=right | 1.0 km || 
|-id=634 bgcolor=#C2FFFF
| 318634 ||  || — || June 1, 2005 || Kitt Peak || Spacewatch || L4 || align=right | 14 km || 
|-id=635 bgcolor=#fefefe
| 318635 ||  || — || June 6, 2005 || Vail-Jarnac || Jarnac Obs. || — || align=right | 1.8 km || 
|-id=636 bgcolor=#fefefe
| 318636 ||  || — || June 4, 2005 || Kitt Peak || Spacewatch || — || align=right | 1.2 km || 
|-id=637 bgcolor=#E9E9E9
| 318637 ||  || — || June 6, 2005 || Kitt Peak || Spacewatch || — || align=right | 1.8 km || 
|-id=638 bgcolor=#d6d6d6
| 318638 ||  || — || June 8, 2005 || Kitt Peak || Spacewatch || — || align=right | 3.7 km || 
|-id=639 bgcolor=#fefefe
| 318639 ||  || — || May 27, 2005 || Campo Imperatore || CINEOS || V || align=right data-sort-value="0.82" | 820 m || 
|-id=640 bgcolor=#fefefe
| 318640 ||  || — || June 11, 2005 || Kitt Peak || Spacewatch || — || align=right data-sort-value="0.94" | 940 m || 
|-id=641 bgcolor=#C2FFFF
| 318641 ||  || — || June 11, 2005 || Kitt Peak || Spacewatch || L4 || align=right | 11 km || 
|-id=642 bgcolor=#fefefe
| 318642 ||  || — || June 10, 2005 || Kitt Peak || Spacewatch || NYS || align=right data-sort-value="0.72" | 720 m || 
|-id=643 bgcolor=#fefefe
| 318643 ||  || — || June 11, 2005 || Kitt Peak || Spacewatch || — || align=right | 1.4 km || 
|-id=644 bgcolor=#fefefe
| 318644 ||  || — || June 16, 2005 || Kitt Peak || Spacewatch || NYS || align=right data-sort-value="0.68" | 680 m || 
|-id=645 bgcolor=#E9E9E9
| 318645 ||  || — || June 24, 2005 || Palomar || NEAT || — || align=right | 1.3 km || 
|-id=646 bgcolor=#fefefe
| 318646 ||  || — || June 28, 2005 || Kitt Peak || Spacewatch || NYS || align=right | 1.1 km || 
|-id=647 bgcolor=#E9E9E9
| 318647 ||  || — || June 28, 2005 || Kitt Peak || Spacewatch || — || align=right | 1.4 km || 
|-id=648 bgcolor=#d6d6d6
| 318648 ||  || — || December 19, 2001 || Socorro || LINEAR || EOS || align=right | 2.4 km || 
|-id=649 bgcolor=#fefefe
| 318649 ||  || — || June 30, 2005 || Palomar || NEAT || ERI || align=right | 1.7 km || 
|-id=650 bgcolor=#E9E9E9
| 318650 ||  || — || June 30, 2005 || Kitt Peak || Spacewatch || — || align=right | 1.2 km || 
|-id=651 bgcolor=#fefefe
| 318651 ||  || — || June 28, 2005 || Palomar || NEAT || — || align=right | 1.6 km || 
|-id=652 bgcolor=#E9E9E9
| 318652 ||  || — || June 27, 2005 || Kitt Peak || Spacewatch || — || align=right | 1.2 km || 
|-id=653 bgcolor=#fefefe
| 318653 ||  || — || June 28, 2005 || Palomar || NEAT || — || align=right | 1.0 km || 
|-id=654 bgcolor=#E9E9E9
| 318654 ||  || — || June 29, 2005 || Kitt Peak || Spacewatch || — || align=right | 1.1 km || 
|-id=655 bgcolor=#fefefe
| 318655 ||  || — || June 30, 2005 || Kitt Peak || Spacewatch || — || align=right data-sort-value="0.83" | 830 m || 
|-id=656 bgcolor=#fefefe
| 318656 ||  || — || July 2, 2005 || Kitt Peak || Spacewatch || NYS || align=right data-sort-value="0.76" | 760 m || 
|-id=657 bgcolor=#fefefe
| 318657 ||  || — || July 3, 2005 || Mount Lemmon || Mount Lemmon Survey || NYS || align=right data-sort-value="0.77" | 770 m || 
|-id=658 bgcolor=#fefefe
| 318658 ||  || — || July 4, 2005 || Mount Lemmon || Mount Lemmon Survey || V || align=right data-sort-value="0.70" | 700 m || 
|-id=659 bgcolor=#fefefe
| 318659 ||  || — || July 5, 2005 || Kitt Peak || Spacewatch || NYS || align=right data-sort-value="0.72" | 720 m || 
|-id=660 bgcolor=#E9E9E9
| 318660 ||  || — || July 4, 2005 || Mount Lemmon || Mount Lemmon Survey || — || align=right | 1.1 km || 
|-id=661 bgcolor=#fefefe
| 318661 ||  || — || July 5, 2005 || Mount Lemmon || Mount Lemmon Survey || — || align=right data-sort-value="0.92" | 920 m || 
|-id=662 bgcolor=#E9E9E9
| 318662 ||  || — || July 6, 2005 || Siding Spring || SSS || MAR || align=right | 1.6 km || 
|-id=663 bgcolor=#fefefe
| 318663 ||  || — || July 7, 2005 || Reedy Creek || J. Broughton || V || align=right data-sort-value="0.71" | 710 m || 
|-id=664 bgcolor=#E9E9E9
| 318664 ||  || — || July 9, 2005 || Kitt Peak || Spacewatch || — || align=right | 1.6 km || 
|-id=665 bgcolor=#E9E9E9
| 318665 ||  || — || July 10, 2005 || Kitt Peak || Spacewatch || — || align=right | 1.0 km || 
|-id=666 bgcolor=#E9E9E9
| 318666 ||  || — || July 12, 2005 || Kitt Peak || Spacewatch || MRX || align=right | 1.2 km || 
|-id=667 bgcolor=#E9E9E9
| 318667 ||  || — || July 27, 2005 || Palomar || NEAT || — || align=right | 1.4 km || 
|-id=668 bgcolor=#fefefe
| 318668 ||  || — || July 29, 2005 || Palomar || NEAT || H || align=right data-sort-value="0.91" | 910 m || 
|-id=669 bgcolor=#d6d6d6
| 318669 ||  || — || July 29, 2005 || Palomar || NEAT || — || align=right | 2.9 km || 
|-id=670 bgcolor=#E9E9E9
| 318670 ||  || — || July 28, 2005 || Palomar || NEAT || — || align=right | 1.9 km || 
|-id=671 bgcolor=#fefefe
| 318671 ||  || — || July 28, 2005 || Palomar || NEAT || MAS || align=right data-sort-value="0.99" | 990 m || 
|-id=672 bgcolor=#d6d6d6
| 318672 ||  || — || August 3, 2005 || Haleakala || NEAT || Tj (2.96) || align=right | 2.9 km || 
|-id=673 bgcolor=#d6d6d6
| 318673 ||  || — || August 4, 2005 || Palomar || NEAT || 3:2 || align=right | 4.8 km || 
|-id=674 bgcolor=#E9E9E9
| 318674 ||  || — || August 4, 2005 || Palomar || NEAT || — || align=right data-sort-value="0.98" | 980 m || 
|-id=675 bgcolor=#E9E9E9
| 318675 ||  || — || August 4, 2005 || Palomar || NEAT || — || align=right | 1.3 km || 
|-id=676 bgcolor=#E9E9E9
| 318676 Bellelay ||  ||  || August 10, 2005 || Vicques || M. Ory || — || align=right | 3.4 km || 
|-id=677 bgcolor=#E9E9E9
| 318677 ||  || — || August 5, 2005 || Palomar || NEAT || — || align=right | 1.5 km || 
|-id=678 bgcolor=#E9E9E9
| 318678 ||  || — || August 25, 2005 || Palomar || NEAT || — || align=right | 2.0 km || 
|-id=679 bgcolor=#fefefe
| 318679 ||  || — || August 25, 2005 || Palomar || NEAT || ERI || align=right | 2.5 km || 
|-id=680 bgcolor=#E9E9E9
| 318680 ||  || — || August 25, 2005 || Palomar || NEAT || — || align=right | 1.8 km || 
|-id=681 bgcolor=#fefefe
| 318681 ||  || — || August 27, 2005 || Kitt Peak || Spacewatch || NYS || align=right data-sort-value="0.57" | 570 m || 
|-id=682 bgcolor=#E9E9E9
| 318682 Carpaccio ||  ||  || August 29, 2005 || Saint-Sulpice || B. Christophe || HOF || align=right | 2.3 km || 
|-id=683 bgcolor=#E9E9E9
| 318683 ||  || — || August 25, 2005 || Palomar || NEAT || — || align=right | 1.8 km || 
|-id=684 bgcolor=#E9E9E9
| 318684 ||  || — || August 26, 2005 || Palomar || NEAT || — || align=right | 1.2 km || 
|-id=685 bgcolor=#E9E9E9
| 318685 ||  || — || August 27, 2005 || Anderson Mesa || LONEOS || JUN || align=right | 1.1 km || 
|-id=686 bgcolor=#E9E9E9
| 318686 ||  || — || August 27, 2005 || Anderson Mesa || LONEOS || — || align=right | 2.8 km || 
|-id=687 bgcolor=#fefefe
| 318687 ||  || — || August 27, 2005 || Anderson Mesa || LONEOS || — || align=right | 1.1 km || 
|-id=688 bgcolor=#E9E9E9
| 318688 ||  || — || August 25, 2005 || Palomar || NEAT || GEF || align=right | 1.5 km || 
|-id=689 bgcolor=#E9E9E9
| 318689 ||  || — || August 26, 2005 || Palomar || NEAT || AGN || align=right | 1.3 km || 
|-id=690 bgcolor=#FA8072
| 318690 ||  || — || August 26, 2005 || Palomar || NEAT || — || align=right data-sort-value="0.58" | 580 m || 
|-id=691 bgcolor=#d6d6d6
| 318691 ||  || — || August 26, 2005 || Palomar || NEAT || — || align=right | 4.2 km || 
|-id=692 bgcolor=#E9E9E9
| 318692 ||  || — || August 29, 2005 || Anderson Mesa || LONEOS || — || align=right | 2.7 km || 
|-id=693 bgcolor=#E9E9E9
| 318693 ||  || — || August 29, 2005 || Anderson Mesa || LONEOS || — || align=right | 2.2 km || 
|-id=694 bgcolor=#E9E9E9
| 318694 Keszthelyi ||  ||  || August 29, 2005 || Piszkéstető || K. Sárneczky, Z. Kuli || — || align=right | 1.8 km || 
|-id=695 bgcolor=#E9E9E9
| 318695 ||  || — || August 29, 2005 || Socorro || LINEAR || BAR || align=right | 1.9 km || 
|-id=696 bgcolor=#E9E9E9
| 318696 ||  || — || August 28, 2005 || Kitt Peak || Spacewatch || MRX || align=right | 1.1 km || 
|-id=697 bgcolor=#E9E9E9
| 318697 ||  || — || August 30, 2005 || Socorro || LINEAR || — || align=right | 3.4 km || 
|-id=698 bgcolor=#d6d6d6
| 318698 Barthalajos ||  ||  || August 30, 2005 || Piszkéstető || K. Sárneczky || — || align=right | 2.3 km || 
|-id=699 bgcolor=#E9E9E9
| 318699 ||  || — || August 26, 2005 || Palomar || NEAT || — || align=right | 2.1 km || 
|-id=700 bgcolor=#E9E9E9
| 318700 ||  || — || August 27, 2005 || Palomar || NEAT || — || align=right | 2.8 km || 
|}

318701–318800 

|-bgcolor=#E9E9E9
| 318701 ||  || — || August 27, 2005 || Palomar || NEAT || MAR || align=right | 1.5 km || 
|-id=702 bgcolor=#E9E9E9
| 318702 ||  || — || August 27, 2005 || Palomar || NEAT || — || align=right | 2.0 km || 
|-id=703 bgcolor=#E9E9E9
| 318703 ||  || — || July 31, 2005 || Palomar || NEAT || NEM || align=right | 2.5 km || 
|-id=704 bgcolor=#E9E9E9
| 318704 ||  || — || August 27, 2005 || Palomar || NEAT || — || align=right | 2.4 km || 
|-id=705 bgcolor=#E9E9E9
| 318705 ||  || — || August 27, 2005 || Palomar || NEAT || — || align=right | 2.2 km || 
|-id=706 bgcolor=#E9E9E9
| 318706 ||  || — || August 27, 2005 || Palomar || NEAT || INO || align=right | 1.6 km || 
|-id=707 bgcolor=#fefefe
| 318707 ||  || — || August 27, 2005 || Palomar || NEAT || — || align=right | 1.0 km || 
|-id=708 bgcolor=#E9E9E9
| 318708 ||  || — || August 28, 2005 || Kitt Peak || Spacewatch || — || align=right | 1.0 km || 
|-id=709 bgcolor=#d6d6d6
| 318709 ||  || — || August 28, 2005 || Kitt Peak || Spacewatch || 7:4 || align=right | 3.7 km || 
|-id=710 bgcolor=#d6d6d6
| 318710 ||  || — || August 28, 2005 || Kitt Peak || Spacewatch || — || align=right | 2.5 km || 
|-id=711 bgcolor=#E9E9E9
| 318711 ||  || — || August 31, 2005 || Anderson Mesa || LONEOS || ADE || align=right | 2.8 km || 
|-id=712 bgcolor=#E9E9E9
| 318712 ||  || — || August 29, 2005 || Anderson Mesa || LONEOS || DOR || align=right | 3.8 km || 
|-id=713 bgcolor=#E9E9E9
| 318713 ||  || — || August 29, 2005 || Palomar || NEAT || ADE || align=right | 2.8 km || 
|-id=714 bgcolor=#d6d6d6
| 318714 ||  || — || August 26, 2005 || Palomar || NEAT || CHA || align=right | 2.6 km || 
|-id=715 bgcolor=#E9E9E9
| 318715 ||  || — || August 26, 2005 || Palomar || NEAT || — || align=right | 2.3 km || 
|-id=716 bgcolor=#d6d6d6
| 318716 ||  || — || August 29, 2005 || Palomar || NEAT || — || align=right | 3.8 km || 
|-id=717 bgcolor=#E9E9E9
| 318717 ||  || — || August 28, 2005 || Kitt Peak || Spacewatch || — || align=right | 2.8 km || 
|-id=718 bgcolor=#E9E9E9
| 318718 ||  || — || August 25, 2005 || Campo Imperatore || CINEOS || — || align=right | 1.6 km || 
|-id=719 bgcolor=#d6d6d6
| 318719 ||  || — || August 27, 2005 || Anderson Mesa || LONEOS || — || align=right | 5.4 km || 
|-id=720 bgcolor=#E9E9E9
| 318720 ||  || — || August 31, 2005 || Palomar || NEAT || EUN || align=right | 1.5 km || 
|-id=721 bgcolor=#d6d6d6
| 318721 ||  || — || August 31, 2005 || Kitt Peak || Spacewatch || K-2 || align=right | 1.3 km || 
|-id=722 bgcolor=#E9E9E9
| 318722 ||  || — || September 1, 2005 || Haleakala || NEAT || — || align=right | 2.3 km || 
|-id=723 bgcolor=#E9E9E9
| 318723 Bialas ||  ||  || September 8, 2005 || Linz || E. Meyer || AER || align=right | 1.4 km || 
|-id=724 bgcolor=#E9E9E9
| 318724 ||  || — || September 8, 2005 || Socorro || LINEAR || GEF || align=right | 1.7 km || 
|-id=725 bgcolor=#fefefe
| 318725 ||  || — || September 10, 2005 || Anderson Mesa || LONEOS || H || align=right | 1.0 km || 
|-id=726 bgcolor=#E9E9E9
| 318726 ||  || — || September 1, 2005 || Kitt Peak || Spacewatch || — || align=right | 1.5 km || 
|-id=727 bgcolor=#E9E9E9
| 318727 ||  || — || September 1, 2005 || Kitt Peak || Spacewatch || — || align=right | 2.0 km || 
|-id=728 bgcolor=#E9E9E9
| 318728 ||  || — || September 1, 2005 || Kitt Peak || Spacewatch || — || align=right | 1.9 km || 
|-id=729 bgcolor=#E9E9E9
| 318729 ||  || — || August 29, 2005 || Kitt Peak || Spacewatch || — || align=right | 2.7 km || 
|-id=730 bgcolor=#E9E9E9
| 318730 ||  || — || September 10, 2005 || Anderson Mesa || LONEOS || GEF || align=right | 1.8 km || 
|-id=731 bgcolor=#E9E9E9
| 318731 ||  || — || September 10, 2005 || Anderson Mesa || LONEOS || — || align=right | 3.3 km || 
|-id=732 bgcolor=#E9E9E9
| 318732 ||  || — || September 12, 2005 || Haleakala || NEAT || — || align=right | 4.0 km || 
|-id=733 bgcolor=#fefefe
| 318733 ||  || — || September 12, 2005 || Haleakala || NEAT || FLO || align=right data-sort-value="0.67" | 670 m || 
|-id=734 bgcolor=#E9E9E9
| 318734 ||  || — || September 12, 2005 || Socorro || LINEAR || — || align=right | 2.2 km || 
|-id=735 bgcolor=#fefefe
| 318735 ||  || — || September 2, 2005 || Palomar || NEAT || H || align=right data-sort-value="0.65" | 650 m || 
|-id=736 bgcolor=#E9E9E9
| 318736 ||  || — || September 13, 2005 || Apache Point || A. C. Becker || — || align=right | 3.4 km || 
|-id=737 bgcolor=#fefefe
| 318737 ||  || — || September 23, 2005 || Catalina || CSS || MAS || align=right | 1.0 km || 
|-id=738 bgcolor=#E9E9E9
| 318738 ||  || — || September 24, 2005 || Kitt Peak || Spacewatch || EUN || align=right | 1.3 km || 
|-id=739 bgcolor=#E9E9E9
| 318739 ||  || — || September 23, 2005 || Kitt Peak || Spacewatch || — || align=right | 1.6 km || 
|-id=740 bgcolor=#E9E9E9
| 318740 ||  || — || September 24, 2005 || Anderson Mesa || LONEOS || — || align=right | 1.8 km || 
|-id=741 bgcolor=#fefefe
| 318741 ||  || — || September 24, 2005 || Kitt Peak || Spacewatch || FLO || align=right data-sort-value="0.81" | 810 m || 
|-id=742 bgcolor=#E9E9E9
| 318742 ||  || — || September 25, 2005 || Catalina || CSS || GEF || align=right | 1.9 km || 
|-id=743 bgcolor=#E9E9E9
| 318743 ||  || — || September 23, 2005 || Kitt Peak || Spacewatch || WIT || align=right | 1.2 km || 
|-id=744 bgcolor=#E9E9E9
| 318744 ||  || — || August 29, 2005 || Anderson Mesa || LONEOS || — || align=right | 2.8 km || 
|-id=745 bgcolor=#E9E9E9
| 318745 ||  || — || September 23, 2005 || Kitt Peak || Spacewatch || AST || align=right | 1.9 km || 
|-id=746 bgcolor=#E9E9E9
| 318746 ||  || — || September 26, 2005 || Kitt Peak || Spacewatch || — || align=right | 2.4 km || 
|-id=747 bgcolor=#E9E9E9
| 318747 ||  || — || September 27, 2005 || Kitt Peak || Spacewatch || GEF || align=right | 1.6 km || 
|-id=748 bgcolor=#E9E9E9
| 318748 ||  || — || September 24, 2005 || Anderson Mesa || LONEOS || MAR || align=right | 1.4 km || 
|-id=749 bgcolor=#fefefe
| 318749 ||  || — || September 23, 2005 || Kitt Peak || Spacewatch || MAS || align=right data-sort-value="0.86" | 860 m || 
|-id=750 bgcolor=#E9E9E9
| 318750 ||  || — || September 23, 2005 || Kitt Peak || Spacewatch || — || align=right | 2.4 km || 
|-id=751 bgcolor=#d6d6d6
| 318751 ||  || — || September 23, 2005 || Kitt Peak || Spacewatch || — || align=right | 2.3 km || 
|-id=752 bgcolor=#E9E9E9
| 318752 ||  || — || September 24, 2005 || Kitt Peak || Spacewatch || — || align=right | 2.5 km || 
|-id=753 bgcolor=#fefefe
| 318753 ||  || — || September 24, 2005 || Kitt Peak || Spacewatch || FLO || align=right data-sort-value="0.68" | 680 m || 
|-id=754 bgcolor=#E9E9E9
| 318754 ||  || — || September 24, 2005 || Kitt Peak || Spacewatch || HOF || align=right | 2.4 km || 
|-id=755 bgcolor=#E9E9E9
| 318755 ||  || — || September 24, 2005 || Kitt Peak || Spacewatch || — || align=right | 2.1 km || 
|-id=756 bgcolor=#E9E9E9
| 318756 ||  || — || September 24, 2005 || Kitt Peak || Spacewatch || AST || align=right | 2.0 km || 
|-id=757 bgcolor=#E9E9E9
| 318757 ||  || — || September 24, 2005 || Kitt Peak || Spacewatch || — || align=right | 2.4 km || 
|-id=758 bgcolor=#E9E9E9
| 318758 ||  || — || September 24, 2005 || Kitt Peak || Spacewatch || — || align=right | 2.8 km || 
|-id=759 bgcolor=#E9E9E9
| 318759 ||  || — || September 24, 2005 || Kitt Peak || Spacewatch || HEN || align=right | 1.3 km || 
|-id=760 bgcolor=#fefefe
| 318760 ||  || — || September 24, 2005 || Kitt Peak || Spacewatch || — || align=right | 1.3 km || 
|-id=761 bgcolor=#E9E9E9
| 318761 ||  || — || September 24, 2005 || Kitt Peak || Spacewatch || AGN || align=right | 1.2 km || 
|-id=762 bgcolor=#E9E9E9
| 318762 ||  || — || September 24, 2005 || Kitt Peak || Spacewatch || — || align=right | 2.0 km || 
|-id=763 bgcolor=#E9E9E9
| 318763 ||  || — || September 25, 2005 || Kitt Peak || Spacewatch || — || align=right | 3.8 km || 
|-id=764 bgcolor=#fefefe
| 318764 ||  || — || September 26, 2005 || Kitt Peak || Spacewatch || — || align=right data-sort-value="0.89" | 890 m || 
|-id=765 bgcolor=#E9E9E9
| 318765 ||  || — || September 26, 2005 || Kitt Peak || Spacewatch || — || align=right | 1.9 km || 
|-id=766 bgcolor=#E9E9E9
| 318766 ||  || — || September 26, 2005 || Kitt Peak || Spacewatch || HOF || align=right | 2.8 km || 
|-id=767 bgcolor=#fefefe
| 318767 ||  || — || September 23, 2005 || Catalina || CSS || — || align=right | 1.1 km || 
|-id=768 bgcolor=#E9E9E9
| 318768 ||  || — || September 23, 2005 || Anderson Mesa || LONEOS || — || align=right | 1.7 km || 
|-id=769 bgcolor=#E9E9E9
| 318769 ||  || — || September 24, 2005 || Kitt Peak || Spacewatch || — || align=right | 2.4 km || 
|-id=770 bgcolor=#E9E9E9
| 318770 ||  || — || September 24, 2005 || Kitt Peak || Spacewatch || — || align=right | 2.2 km || 
|-id=771 bgcolor=#E9E9E9
| 318771 ||  || — || September 24, 2005 || Kitt Peak || Spacewatch || HEN || align=right | 1.1 km || 
|-id=772 bgcolor=#E9E9E9
| 318772 ||  || — || September 24, 2005 || Kitt Peak || Spacewatch || DOR || align=right | 2.6 km || 
|-id=773 bgcolor=#E9E9E9
| 318773 ||  || — || September 24, 2005 || Kitt Peak || Spacewatch || DOR || align=right | 2.9 km || 
|-id=774 bgcolor=#d6d6d6
| 318774 ||  || — || September 24, 2005 || Kitt Peak || Spacewatch || — || align=right | 2.0 km || 
|-id=775 bgcolor=#E9E9E9
| 318775 ||  || — || September 24, 2005 || Kitt Peak || Spacewatch || HEN || align=right | 1.3 km || 
|-id=776 bgcolor=#fefefe
| 318776 ||  || — || September 24, 2005 || Kitt Peak || Spacewatch || H || align=right data-sort-value="0.98" | 980 m || 
|-id=777 bgcolor=#E9E9E9
| 318777 ||  || — || September 24, 2005 || Kitt Peak || Spacewatch || — || align=right | 1.2 km || 
|-id=778 bgcolor=#E9E9E9
| 318778 ||  || — || September 24, 2005 || Kitt Peak || Spacewatch || — || align=right | 1.8 km || 
|-id=779 bgcolor=#E9E9E9
| 318779 ||  || — || September 25, 2005 || Kitt Peak || Spacewatch || WIT || align=right | 1.0 km || 
|-id=780 bgcolor=#fefefe
| 318780 ||  || — || September 25, 2005 || Kitt Peak || Spacewatch || — || align=right data-sort-value="0.89" | 890 m || 
|-id=781 bgcolor=#d6d6d6
| 318781 ||  || — || September 25, 2005 || Kitt Peak || Spacewatch || — || align=right | 2.3 km || 
|-id=782 bgcolor=#E9E9E9
| 318782 ||  || — || September 25, 2005 || Kitt Peak || Spacewatch || — || align=right | 2.3 km || 
|-id=783 bgcolor=#d6d6d6
| 318783 ||  || — || September 25, 2005 || Kitt Peak || Spacewatch || CHA || align=right | 2.2 km || 
|-id=784 bgcolor=#fefefe
| 318784 ||  || — || September 25, 2005 || Palomar || NEAT || NYS || align=right data-sort-value="0.84" | 840 m || 
|-id=785 bgcolor=#E9E9E9
| 318785 ||  || — || September 26, 2005 || Kitt Peak || Spacewatch || — || align=right | 2.5 km || 
|-id=786 bgcolor=#FA8072
| 318786 ||  || — || September 28, 2005 || Palomar || NEAT || H || align=right data-sort-value="0.74" | 740 m || 
|-id=787 bgcolor=#d6d6d6
| 318787 ||  || — || September 28, 2005 || Palomar || NEAT || — || align=right | 3.5 km || 
|-id=788 bgcolor=#d6d6d6
| 318788 ||  || — || September 28, 2005 || Palomar || NEAT || BRA || align=right | 1.8 km || 
|-id=789 bgcolor=#E9E9E9
| 318789 ||  || — || September 29, 2005 || Mount Lemmon || Mount Lemmon Survey || — || align=right | 2.1 km || 
|-id=790 bgcolor=#E9E9E9
| 318790 ||  || — || September 29, 2005 || Mount Lemmon || Mount Lemmon Survey || NEM || align=right | 2.4 km || 
|-id=791 bgcolor=#E9E9E9
| 318791 ||  || — || September 29, 2005 || Mount Lemmon || Mount Lemmon Survey || — || align=right | 2.5 km || 
|-id=792 bgcolor=#E9E9E9
| 318792 ||  || — || September 29, 2005 || Mount Lemmon || Mount Lemmon Survey || NEM || align=right | 3.3 km || 
|-id=793 bgcolor=#E9E9E9
| 318793 ||  || — || September 29, 2005 || Anderson Mesa || LONEOS || — || align=right | 2.1 km || 
|-id=794 bgcolor=#E9E9E9
| 318794 Uglia ||  ||  || September 25, 2005 || Andrushivka || Andrushivka Obs. || — || align=right | 3.7 km || 
|-id=795 bgcolor=#E9E9E9
| 318795 ||  || — || September 24, 2005 || Kitt Peak || Spacewatch || — || align=right | 1.5 km || 
|-id=796 bgcolor=#E9E9E9
| 318796 ||  || — || September 24, 2005 || Kitt Peak || Spacewatch || — || align=right | 1.6 km || 
|-id=797 bgcolor=#d6d6d6
| 318797 ||  || — || September 24, 2005 || Kitt Peak || Spacewatch || KOR || align=right | 1.4 km || 
|-id=798 bgcolor=#E9E9E9
| 318798 ||  || — || September 25, 2005 || Kitt Peak || Spacewatch || MIS || align=right | 2.9 km || 
|-id=799 bgcolor=#E9E9E9
| 318799 ||  || — || September 25, 2005 || Kitt Peak || Spacewatch || — || align=right | 2.2 km || 
|-id=800 bgcolor=#d6d6d6
| 318800 ||  || — || September 25, 2005 || Kitt Peak || Spacewatch || KOR || align=right | 1.2 km || 
|}

318801–318900 

|-bgcolor=#d6d6d6
| 318801 ||  || — || September 25, 2005 || Kitt Peak || Spacewatch || THM || align=right | 2.2 km || 
|-id=802 bgcolor=#fefefe
| 318802 ||  || — || September 25, 2005 || Kitt Peak || Spacewatch || MAS || align=right data-sort-value="0.92" | 920 m || 
|-id=803 bgcolor=#E9E9E9
| 318803 ||  || — || September 26, 2005 || Kitt Peak || Spacewatch || HEN || align=right | 1.1 km || 
|-id=804 bgcolor=#E9E9E9
| 318804 ||  || — || September 26, 2005 || Kitt Peak || Spacewatch || NEM || align=right | 2.0 km || 
|-id=805 bgcolor=#E9E9E9
| 318805 ||  || — || September 26, 2005 || Kitt Peak || Spacewatch || WIT || align=right | 1.5 km || 
|-id=806 bgcolor=#E9E9E9
| 318806 ||  || — || September 27, 2005 || Kitt Peak || Spacewatch || — || align=right | 2.1 km || 
|-id=807 bgcolor=#E9E9E9
| 318807 ||  || — || September 28, 2005 || Palomar || NEAT || — || align=right | 1.7 km || 
|-id=808 bgcolor=#E9E9E9
| 318808 ||  || — || September 28, 2005 || Palomar || NEAT || EUN || align=right | 1.7 km || 
|-id=809 bgcolor=#fefefe
| 318809 ||  || — || September 28, 2005 || Palomar || NEAT || H || align=right data-sort-value="0.80" | 800 m || 
|-id=810 bgcolor=#E9E9E9
| 318810 ||  || — || September 29, 2005 || Kitt Peak || Spacewatch || — || align=right | 2.7 km || 
|-id=811 bgcolor=#d6d6d6
| 318811 ||  || — || September 29, 2005 || Kitt Peak || Spacewatch || — || align=right | 2.5 km || 
|-id=812 bgcolor=#E9E9E9
| 318812 ||  || — || September 29, 2005 || Kitt Peak || Spacewatch || WIT || align=right | 1.2 km || 
|-id=813 bgcolor=#E9E9E9
| 318813 ||  || — || September 29, 2005 || Kitt Peak || Spacewatch || — || align=right | 2.1 km || 
|-id=814 bgcolor=#E9E9E9
| 318814 ||  || — || September 29, 2005 || Kitt Peak || Spacewatch || PAD || align=right | 2.2 km || 
|-id=815 bgcolor=#d6d6d6
| 318815 ||  || — || September 29, 2005 || Kitt Peak || Spacewatch || Tj (2.99) || align=right | 5.1 km || 
|-id=816 bgcolor=#E9E9E9
| 318816 ||  || — || September 29, 2005 || Kitt Peak || Spacewatch || — || align=right | 2.0 km || 
|-id=817 bgcolor=#E9E9E9
| 318817 ||  || — || September 29, 2005 || Mount Lemmon || Mount Lemmon Survey || — || align=right | 2.6 km || 
|-id=818 bgcolor=#fefefe
| 318818 ||  || — || September 29, 2005 || Palomar || NEAT || H || align=right data-sort-value="0.75" | 750 m || 
|-id=819 bgcolor=#E9E9E9
| 318819 ||  || — || September 29, 2005 || Kitt Peak || Spacewatch || — || align=right | 4.1 km || 
|-id=820 bgcolor=#E9E9E9
| 318820 ||  || — || September 30, 2005 || Kitt Peak || Spacewatch || — || align=right | 2.2 km || 
|-id=821 bgcolor=#E9E9E9
| 318821 ||  || — || September 30, 2005 || Palomar || NEAT || — || align=right | 3.1 km || 
|-id=822 bgcolor=#E9E9E9
| 318822 ||  || — || September 30, 2005 || Palomar || NEAT || — || align=right | 2.4 km || 
|-id=823 bgcolor=#d6d6d6
| 318823 ||  || — || September 30, 2005 || Mount Lemmon || Mount Lemmon Survey || — || align=right | 1.7 km || 
|-id=824 bgcolor=#E9E9E9
| 318824 ||  || — || September 30, 2005 || Kitt Peak || Spacewatch || HEN || align=right | 1.1 km || 
|-id=825 bgcolor=#E9E9E9
| 318825 ||  || — || September 30, 2005 || Catalina || CSS || — || align=right | 3.4 km || 
|-id=826 bgcolor=#fefefe
| 318826 ||  || — || September 30, 2005 || Palomar || NEAT || — || align=right | 1.2 km || 
|-id=827 bgcolor=#E9E9E9
| 318827 ||  || — || September 29, 2005 || Catalina || CSS || EUN || align=right | 1.9 km || 
|-id=828 bgcolor=#d6d6d6
| 318828 ||  || — || September 30, 2005 || Kitt Peak || Spacewatch || — || align=right | 1.8 km || 
|-id=829 bgcolor=#E9E9E9
| 318829 ||  || — || September 30, 2005 || Mount Lemmon || Mount Lemmon Survey || AEO || align=right | 1.5 km || 
|-id=830 bgcolor=#E9E9E9
| 318830 ||  || — || September 30, 2005 || Mount Lemmon || Mount Lemmon Survey || AST || align=right | 2.0 km || 
|-id=831 bgcolor=#E9E9E9
| 318831 ||  || — || September 30, 2005 || Kitt Peak || Spacewatch || — || align=right | 2.4 km || 
|-id=832 bgcolor=#E9E9E9
| 318832 ||  || — || September 25, 2005 || Kitt Peak || Spacewatch || — || align=right | 2.9 km || 
|-id=833 bgcolor=#E9E9E9
| 318833 ||  || — || September 30, 2005 || Kitt Peak || Spacewatch || AGN || align=right | 1.5 km || 
|-id=834 bgcolor=#d6d6d6
| 318834 ||  || — || September 30, 2005 || Mount Lemmon || Mount Lemmon Survey || KOR || align=right | 1.2 km || 
|-id=835 bgcolor=#fefefe
| 318835 ||  || — || September 23, 2005 || Palomar || NEAT || — || align=right | 1.3 km || 
|-id=836 bgcolor=#E9E9E9
| 318836 ||  || — || September 22, 2005 || Palomar || NEAT || — || align=right | 2.9 km || 
|-id=837 bgcolor=#E9E9E9
| 318837 ||  || — || September 23, 2005 || Kitt Peak || Spacewatch || — || align=right | 2.3 km || 
|-id=838 bgcolor=#E9E9E9
| 318838 ||  || — || September 27, 2005 || Palomar || NEAT || — || align=right | 3.6 km || 
|-id=839 bgcolor=#fefefe
| 318839 ||  || — || September 23, 2005 || Kitt Peak || Spacewatch || V || align=right data-sort-value="0.73" | 730 m || 
|-id=840 bgcolor=#E9E9E9
| 318840 ||  || — || September 29, 2005 || Anderson Mesa || LONEOS || — || align=right | 2.7 km || 
|-id=841 bgcolor=#E9E9E9
| 318841 ||  || — || September 29, 2005 || Mount Lemmon || Mount Lemmon Survey || — || align=right | 1.2 km || 
|-id=842 bgcolor=#E9E9E9
| 318842 ||  || — || September 29, 2005 || Palomar || NEAT || — || align=right | 3.2 km || 
|-id=843 bgcolor=#E9E9E9
| 318843 ||  || — || September 27, 2005 || Kitt Peak || Spacewatch || — || align=right | 2.9 km || 
|-id=844 bgcolor=#E9E9E9
| 318844 ||  || — || March 25, 2003 || Anderson Mesa || LONEOS || — || align=right | 2.9 km || 
|-id=845 bgcolor=#d6d6d6
| 318845 ||  || — || September 21, 2005 || Apache Point || A. C. Becker || — || align=right | 2.3 km || 
|-id=846 bgcolor=#E9E9E9
| 318846 ||  || — || September 27, 2005 || Kitt Peak || Spacewatch || HOF || align=right | 2.8 km || 
|-id=847 bgcolor=#E9E9E9
| 318847 ||  || — || October 1, 2005 || Catalina || CSS || — || align=right | 2.9 km || 
|-id=848 bgcolor=#E9E9E9
| 318848 ||  || — || October 1, 2005 || Catalina || CSS || ADE || align=right | 2.9 km || 
|-id=849 bgcolor=#E9E9E9
| 318849 ||  || — || October 1, 2005 || Kitt Peak || Spacewatch || HNS || align=right | 1.3 km || 
|-id=850 bgcolor=#fefefe
| 318850 ||  || — || October 1, 2005 || Anderson Mesa || LONEOS || H || align=right data-sort-value="0.99" | 990 m || 
|-id=851 bgcolor=#E9E9E9
| 318851 ||  || — || October 1, 2005 || Anderson Mesa || LONEOS || JUN || align=right | 1.3 km || 
|-id=852 bgcolor=#fefefe
| 318852 ||  || — || October 1, 2005 || Mount Lemmon || Mount Lemmon Survey || — || align=right | 1.3 km || 
|-id=853 bgcolor=#E9E9E9
| 318853 ||  || — || October 1, 2005 || Kitt Peak || Spacewatch || WIT || align=right data-sort-value="0.84" | 840 m || 
|-id=854 bgcolor=#E9E9E9
| 318854 ||  || — || October 1, 2005 || Kitt Peak || Spacewatch || GEF || align=right | 1.3 km || 
|-id=855 bgcolor=#E9E9E9
| 318855 ||  || — || October 1, 2005 || Kitt Peak || Spacewatch || EUN || align=right | 1.6 km || 
|-id=856 bgcolor=#E9E9E9
| 318856 ||  || — || September 2, 2000 || Kitt Peak || Spacewatch || WIT || align=right | 1.4 km || 
|-id=857 bgcolor=#E9E9E9
| 318857 ||  || — || October 3, 2005 || Socorro || LINEAR || — || align=right | 5.1 km || 
|-id=858 bgcolor=#fefefe
| 318858 ||  || — || October 13, 2005 || Mount Lemmon || Mount Lemmon Survey || H || align=right data-sort-value="0.56" | 560 m || 
|-id=859 bgcolor=#E9E9E9
| 318859 ||  || — || October 4, 2005 || Mount Lemmon || Mount Lemmon Survey || JUN || align=right | 1.6 km || 
|-id=860 bgcolor=#d6d6d6
| 318860 ||  || — || October 1, 2005 || Mount Lemmon || Mount Lemmon Survey || KOR || align=right | 1.3 km || 
|-id=861 bgcolor=#E9E9E9
| 318861 ||  || — || October 1, 2005 || Mount Lemmon || Mount Lemmon Survey || — || align=right | 2.6 km || 
|-id=862 bgcolor=#E9E9E9
| 318862 ||  || — || October 3, 2005 || Kitt Peak || Spacewatch || — || align=right | 2.6 km || 
|-id=863 bgcolor=#d6d6d6
| 318863 ||  || — || October 3, 2005 || Kitt Peak || Spacewatch || — || align=right | 2.9 km || 
|-id=864 bgcolor=#d6d6d6
| 318864 ||  || — || October 4, 2005 || Mount Lemmon || Mount Lemmon Survey || K-2 || align=right | 1.3 km || 
|-id=865 bgcolor=#E9E9E9
| 318865 ||  || — || October 6, 2005 || Mount Lemmon || Mount Lemmon Survey || — || align=right | 2.7 km || 
|-id=866 bgcolor=#d6d6d6
| 318866 ||  || — || October 6, 2005 || Catalina || CSS || — || align=right | 4.5 km || 
|-id=867 bgcolor=#E9E9E9
| 318867 ||  || — || October 5, 2005 || Catalina || CSS || — || align=right | 1.9 km || 
|-id=868 bgcolor=#fefefe
| 318868 ||  || — || October 2, 2005 || Palomar || NEAT || FLO || align=right data-sort-value="0.84" | 840 m || 
|-id=869 bgcolor=#E9E9E9
| 318869 ||  || — || October 3, 2005 || Kitt Peak || Spacewatch || — || align=right | 2.6 km || 
|-id=870 bgcolor=#E9E9E9
| 318870 ||  || — || October 3, 2005 || Kitt Peak || Spacewatch || — || align=right | 1.4 km || 
|-id=871 bgcolor=#d6d6d6
| 318871 ||  || — || October 3, 2005 || Kitt Peak || Spacewatch || — || align=right | 3.1 km || 
|-id=872 bgcolor=#E9E9E9
| 318872 ||  || — || October 5, 2005 || Mount Lemmon || Mount Lemmon Survey || — || align=right | 1.2 km || 
|-id=873 bgcolor=#E9E9E9
| 318873 ||  || — || October 6, 2005 || Mount Lemmon || Mount Lemmon Survey || AST || align=right | 1.7 km || 
|-id=874 bgcolor=#E9E9E9
| 318874 ||  || — || October 6, 2005 || Mount Lemmon || Mount Lemmon Survey || PAD || align=right | 2.1 km || 
|-id=875 bgcolor=#C7FF8F
| 318875 ||  || — || October 7, 2005 || Kitt Peak || Spacewatch || Tj (2.95) || align=right | 7.6 km || 
|-id=876 bgcolor=#E9E9E9
| 318876 ||  || — || October 7, 2005 || Mount Lemmon || Mount Lemmon Survey || AGN || align=right | 1.3 km || 
|-id=877 bgcolor=#E9E9E9
| 318877 ||  || — || October 8, 2005 || Catalina || CSS || — || align=right | 2.9 km || 
|-id=878 bgcolor=#E9E9E9
| 318878 ||  || — || October 7, 2005 || Kitt Peak || Spacewatch || — || align=right | 1.6 km || 
|-id=879 bgcolor=#E9E9E9
| 318879 ||  || — || October 7, 2005 || Kitt Peak || Spacewatch || — || align=right | 1.6 km || 
|-id=880 bgcolor=#E9E9E9
| 318880 ||  || — || October 7, 2005 || Kitt Peak || Spacewatch || — || align=right | 1.9 km || 
|-id=881 bgcolor=#E9E9E9
| 318881 ||  || — || October 7, 2005 || Kitt Peak || Spacewatch || — || align=right | 2.3 km || 
|-id=882 bgcolor=#E9E9E9
| 318882 ||  || — || October 7, 2005 || Kitt Peak || Spacewatch || — || align=right | 2.1 km || 
|-id=883 bgcolor=#d6d6d6
| 318883 ||  || — || September 26, 2005 || Kitt Peak || Spacewatch || — || align=right | 2.4 km || 
|-id=884 bgcolor=#d6d6d6
| 318884 ||  || — || October 7, 2005 || Kitt Peak || Spacewatch || K-2 || align=right | 1.3 km || 
|-id=885 bgcolor=#E9E9E9
| 318885 ||  || — || October 7, 2005 || Kitt Peak || Spacewatch || — || align=right | 1.3 km || 
|-id=886 bgcolor=#E9E9E9
| 318886 ||  || — || October 7, 2005 || Kitt Peak || Spacewatch || — || align=right | 2.2 km || 
|-id=887 bgcolor=#E9E9E9
| 318887 ||  || — || October 6, 2005 || Kitt Peak || Spacewatch || WIT || align=right | 1.0 km || 
|-id=888 bgcolor=#E9E9E9
| 318888 ||  || — || October 8, 2005 || Kitt Peak || Spacewatch || — || align=right | 2.3 km || 
|-id=889 bgcolor=#E9E9E9
| 318889 ||  || — || October 8, 2005 || Kitt Peak || Spacewatch || EUN || align=right | 1.2 km || 
|-id=890 bgcolor=#d6d6d6
| 318890 ||  || — || October 9, 2005 || Kitt Peak || Spacewatch || CHA || align=right | 1.7 km || 
|-id=891 bgcolor=#E9E9E9
| 318891 ||  || — || October 9, 2005 || Kitt Peak || Spacewatch || — || align=right | 2.2 km || 
|-id=892 bgcolor=#E9E9E9
| 318892 ||  || — || October 9, 2005 || Kitt Peak || Spacewatch || HOF || align=right | 3.2 km || 
|-id=893 bgcolor=#E9E9E9
| 318893 ||  || — || October 9, 2005 || Kitt Peak || Spacewatch || — || align=right | 2.3 km || 
|-id=894 bgcolor=#E9E9E9
| 318894 ||  || — || October 9, 2005 || Kitt Peak || Spacewatch || — || align=right | 3.0 km || 
|-id=895 bgcolor=#E9E9E9
| 318895 ||  || — || October 1, 2005 || Mount Lemmon || Mount Lemmon Survey || — || align=right | 2.7 km || 
|-id=896 bgcolor=#E9E9E9
| 318896 ||  || — || October 1, 2005 || Socorro || LINEAR || WIT || align=right | 1.4 km || 
|-id=897 bgcolor=#d6d6d6
| 318897 ||  || — || October 1, 2005 || Anderson Mesa || LONEOS || — || align=right | 3.0 km || 
|-id=898 bgcolor=#fefefe
| 318898 ||  || — || October 1, 2005 || Catalina || CSS || — || align=right | 1.1 km || 
|-id=899 bgcolor=#E9E9E9
| 318899 ||  || — || October 7, 2005 || Kitt Peak || Spacewatch || HEN || align=right | 1.1 km || 
|-id=900 bgcolor=#E9E9E9
| 318900 ||  || — || September 24, 2005 || Kitt Peak || Spacewatch || WIT || align=right | 1.1 km || 
|}

318901–319000 

|-bgcolor=#d6d6d6
| 318901 ||  || — || October 10, 2005 || Catalina || CSS || — || align=right | 2.9 km || 
|-id=902 bgcolor=#FA8072
| 318902 ||  || — || October 25, 2005 || Socorro || LINEAR || — || align=right | 1.0 km || 
|-id=903 bgcolor=#fefefe
| 318903 ||  || — || October 27, 2005 || Ottmarsheim || C. Rinner || NYS || align=right data-sort-value="0.92" | 920 m || 
|-id=904 bgcolor=#E9E9E9
| 318904 ||  || — || October 21, 2005 || Palomar || NEAT || — || align=right | 1.5 km || 
|-id=905 bgcolor=#E9E9E9
| 318905 ||  || — || October 22, 2005 || Kitt Peak || Spacewatch || — || align=right | 2.6 km || 
|-id=906 bgcolor=#E9E9E9
| 318906 ||  || — || October 23, 2005 || Kitt Peak || Spacewatch || WIT || align=right | 1.5 km || 
|-id=907 bgcolor=#d6d6d6
| 318907 ||  || — || October 23, 2005 || Kitt Peak || Spacewatch || — || align=right | 2.9 km || 
|-id=908 bgcolor=#fefefe
| 318908 ||  || — || October 23, 2005 || Kitt Peak || Spacewatch || — || align=right data-sort-value="0.76" | 760 m || 
|-id=909 bgcolor=#fefefe
| 318909 ||  || — || October 24, 2005 || Kitt Peak || Spacewatch || — || align=right data-sort-value="0.98" | 980 m || 
|-id=910 bgcolor=#d6d6d6
| 318910 ||  || — || October 24, 2005 || Kitt Peak || Spacewatch || — || align=right | 2.9 km || 
|-id=911 bgcolor=#E9E9E9
| 318911 ||  || — || October 22, 2005 || Kitt Peak || Spacewatch || — || align=right | 2.9 km || 
|-id=912 bgcolor=#E9E9E9
| 318912 ||  || — || October 22, 2005 || Catalina || CSS || MAR || align=right | 1.6 km || 
|-id=913 bgcolor=#E9E9E9
| 318913 ||  || — || October 22, 2005 || Catalina || CSS || WIT || align=right | 1.5 km || 
|-id=914 bgcolor=#d6d6d6
| 318914 ||  || — || October 22, 2005 || Kitt Peak || Spacewatch || KOR || align=right | 1.8 km || 
|-id=915 bgcolor=#E9E9E9
| 318915 ||  || — || October 23, 2005 || Catalina || CSS || HOF || align=right | 3.8 km || 
|-id=916 bgcolor=#E9E9E9
| 318916 ||  || — || October 24, 2005 || Anderson Mesa || LONEOS || AGN || align=right | 1.5 km || 
|-id=917 bgcolor=#d6d6d6
| 318917 ||  || — || October 24, 2005 || Kitt Peak || Spacewatch || — || align=right | 2.6 km || 
|-id=918 bgcolor=#d6d6d6
| 318918 ||  || — || October 25, 2005 || Anderson Mesa || LONEOS || — || align=right | 2.7 km || 
|-id=919 bgcolor=#d6d6d6
| 318919 ||  || — || October 25, 2005 || Mount Lemmon || Mount Lemmon Survey || SAN || align=right | 1.5 km || 
|-id=920 bgcolor=#E9E9E9
| 318920 ||  || — || October 23, 2005 || Catalina || CSS || EUN || align=right | 1.7 km || 
|-id=921 bgcolor=#d6d6d6
| 318921 ||  || — || October 23, 2005 || Palomar || NEAT || — || align=right | 3.0 km || 
|-id=922 bgcolor=#fefefe
| 318922 ||  || — || October 24, 2005 || Palomar || NEAT || FLO || align=right data-sort-value="0.94" | 940 m || 
|-id=923 bgcolor=#E9E9E9
| 318923 ||  || — || October 25, 2005 || Mount Lemmon || Mount Lemmon Survey || AST || align=right | 1.9 km || 
|-id=924 bgcolor=#fefefe
| 318924 ||  || — || October 22, 2005 || Kitt Peak || Spacewatch || — || align=right data-sort-value="0.76" | 760 m || 
|-id=925 bgcolor=#E9E9E9
| 318925 ||  || — || October 22, 2005 || Kitt Peak || Spacewatch || — || align=right | 2.9 km || 
|-id=926 bgcolor=#d6d6d6
| 318926 ||  || — || October 22, 2005 || Kitt Peak || Spacewatch || HIL3:2 || align=right | 7.4 km || 
|-id=927 bgcolor=#E9E9E9
| 318927 ||  || — || October 22, 2005 || Kitt Peak || Spacewatch || — || align=right | 2.7 km || 
|-id=928 bgcolor=#E9E9E9
| 318928 ||  || — || October 22, 2005 || Kitt Peak || Spacewatch || GEF || align=right | 1.7 km || 
|-id=929 bgcolor=#d6d6d6
| 318929 ||  || — || October 22, 2005 || Kitt Peak || Spacewatch || — || align=right | 2.7 km || 
|-id=930 bgcolor=#d6d6d6
| 318930 ||  || — || October 22, 2005 || Kitt Peak || Spacewatch || — || align=right | 2.5 km || 
|-id=931 bgcolor=#d6d6d6
| 318931 ||  || — || October 22, 2005 || Kitt Peak || Spacewatch || THM || align=right | 1.9 km || 
|-id=932 bgcolor=#E9E9E9
| 318932 ||  || — || October 22, 2005 || Kitt Peak || Spacewatch || — || align=right | 2.0 km || 
|-id=933 bgcolor=#d6d6d6
| 318933 ||  || — || October 22, 2005 || Kitt Peak || Spacewatch || — || align=right | 2.8 km || 
|-id=934 bgcolor=#E9E9E9
| 318934 ||  || — || October 22, 2005 || Kitt Peak || Spacewatch || — || align=right | 2.3 km || 
|-id=935 bgcolor=#E9E9E9
| 318935 ||  || — || April 6, 2003 || Kitt Peak || Spacewatch || NEM || align=right | 3.5 km || 
|-id=936 bgcolor=#d6d6d6
| 318936 ||  || — || October 24, 2005 || Kitt Peak || Spacewatch || — || align=right | 2.9 km || 
|-id=937 bgcolor=#d6d6d6
| 318937 ||  || — || October 24, 2005 || Kitt Peak || Spacewatch || EOS || align=right | 1.7 km || 
|-id=938 bgcolor=#d6d6d6
| 318938 ||  || — || October 24, 2005 || Palomar || NEAT || — || align=right | 3.5 km || 
|-id=939 bgcolor=#d6d6d6
| 318939 ||  || — || October 25, 2005 || Mount Lemmon || Mount Lemmon Survey || — || align=right | 1.8 km || 
|-id=940 bgcolor=#d6d6d6
| 318940 ||  || — || October 25, 2005 || Catalina || CSS || — || align=right | 3.0 km || 
|-id=941 bgcolor=#E9E9E9
| 318941 ||  || — || October 25, 2005 || Kitt Peak || Spacewatch || AST || align=right | 2.0 km || 
|-id=942 bgcolor=#d6d6d6
| 318942 ||  || — || October 26, 2005 || Kitt Peak || Spacewatch || — || align=right | 2.2 km || 
|-id=943 bgcolor=#d6d6d6
| 318943 ||  || — || October 26, 2005 || Kitt Peak || Spacewatch || — || align=right | 1.8 km || 
|-id=944 bgcolor=#d6d6d6
| 318944 ||  || — || October 22, 2005 || Palomar || NEAT || EOS || align=right | 2.9 km || 
|-id=945 bgcolor=#E9E9E9
| 318945 ||  || — || October 23, 2005 || Kitt Peak || Spacewatch || — || align=right | 2.6 km || 
|-id=946 bgcolor=#d6d6d6
| 318946 ||  || — || October 24, 2005 || Kitt Peak || Spacewatch || KOR || align=right | 1.4 km || 
|-id=947 bgcolor=#E9E9E9
| 318947 ||  || — || October 27, 2005 || Mount Lemmon || Mount Lemmon Survey || HOF || align=right | 2.9 km || 
|-id=948 bgcolor=#E9E9E9
| 318948 ||  || — || October 22, 2005 || Kitt Peak || Spacewatch || AST || align=right | 1.9 km || 
|-id=949 bgcolor=#E9E9E9
| 318949 ||  || — || October 25, 2005 || Kitt Peak || Spacewatch || GEF || align=right | 1.6 km || 
|-id=950 bgcolor=#fefefe
| 318950 ||  || — || October 22, 2005 || Palomar || NEAT || — || align=right data-sort-value="0.90" | 900 m || 
|-id=951 bgcolor=#E9E9E9
| 318951 ||  || — || October 23, 2005 || Catalina || CSS || — || align=right | 2.4 km || 
|-id=952 bgcolor=#E9E9E9
| 318952 ||  || — || October 26, 2005 || Kitt Peak || Spacewatch || — || align=right | 2.3 km || 
|-id=953 bgcolor=#E9E9E9
| 318953 ||  || — || October 25, 2005 || Kitt Peak || Spacewatch || HOF || align=right | 2.8 km || 
|-id=954 bgcolor=#fefefe
| 318954 ||  || — || October 25, 2005 || Kitt Peak || Spacewatch || — || align=right data-sort-value="0.82" | 820 m || 
|-id=955 bgcolor=#d6d6d6
| 318955 ||  || — || October 25, 2005 || Kitt Peak || Spacewatch || — || align=right | 2.6 km || 
|-id=956 bgcolor=#E9E9E9
| 318956 ||  || — || October 25, 2005 || Mount Lemmon || Mount Lemmon Survey || HOF || align=right | 2.9 km || 
|-id=957 bgcolor=#E9E9E9
| 318957 ||  || — || October 25, 2005 || Mount Lemmon || Mount Lemmon Survey || AST || align=right | 2.3 km || 
|-id=958 bgcolor=#E9E9E9
| 318958 ||  || — || October 25, 2005 || Kitt Peak || Spacewatch || — || align=right | 3.4 km || 
|-id=959 bgcolor=#E9E9E9
| 318959 ||  || — || October 25, 2005 || Kitt Peak || Spacewatch || — || align=right | 2.9 km || 
|-id=960 bgcolor=#E9E9E9
| 318960 ||  || — || October 27, 2005 || Mount Lemmon || Mount Lemmon Survey || HOF || align=right | 2.4 km || 
|-id=961 bgcolor=#d6d6d6
| 318961 ||  || — || October 28, 2005 || Mount Lemmon || Mount Lemmon Survey || K-2 || align=right | 1.3 km || 
|-id=962 bgcolor=#d6d6d6
| 318962 ||  || — || October 28, 2005 || Mount Lemmon || Mount Lemmon Survey || KOR || align=right | 1.4 km || 
|-id=963 bgcolor=#E9E9E9
| 318963 ||  || — || October 28, 2005 || Mount Lemmon || Mount Lemmon Survey || — || align=right | 1.3 km || 
|-id=964 bgcolor=#E9E9E9
| 318964 ||  || — || October 22, 2005 || Kitt Peak || Spacewatch || AGN || align=right | 1.6 km || 
|-id=965 bgcolor=#E9E9E9
| 318965 ||  || — || October 25, 2005 || Kitt Peak || Spacewatch || DOR || align=right | 3.2 km || 
|-id=966 bgcolor=#d6d6d6
| 318966 ||  || — || October 29, 2005 || Catalina || CSS || NAE || align=right | 4.1 km || 
|-id=967 bgcolor=#E9E9E9
| 318967 ||  || — || October 24, 2005 || Kitt Peak || Spacewatch || — || align=right | 3.5 km || 
|-id=968 bgcolor=#d6d6d6
| 318968 ||  || — || October 26, 2005 || Kitt Peak || Spacewatch || — || align=right | 2.2 km || 
|-id=969 bgcolor=#d6d6d6
| 318969 ||  || — || October 26, 2005 || Kitt Peak || Spacewatch || — || align=right | 2.6 km || 
|-id=970 bgcolor=#d6d6d6
| 318970 ||  || — || October 26, 2005 || Kitt Peak || Spacewatch || — || align=right | 3.2 km || 
|-id=971 bgcolor=#E9E9E9
| 318971 ||  || — || October 26, 2005 || Kitt Peak || Spacewatch || HOF || align=right | 3.2 km || 
|-id=972 bgcolor=#d6d6d6
| 318972 ||  || — || October 26, 2005 || Kitt Peak || Spacewatch || — || align=right | 3.9 km || 
|-id=973 bgcolor=#d6d6d6
| 318973 ||  || — || October 26, 2005 || Kitt Peak || Spacewatch || EOS || align=right | 2.3 km || 
|-id=974 bgcolor=#d6d6d6
| 318974 ||  || — || October 26, 2005 || Kitt Peak || Spacewatch || — || align=right | 2.4 km || 
|-id=975 bgcolor=#d6d6d6
| 318975 ||  || — || October 26, 2005 || Kitt Peak || Spacewatch || KOR || align=right | 1.4 km || 
|-id=976 bgcolor=#fefefe
| 318976 ||  || — || October 26, 2005 || Kitt Peak || Spacewatch || — || align=right | 1.0 km || 
|-id=977 bgcolor=#d6d6d6
| 318977 ||  || — || October 29, 2005 || Kitt Peak || Spacewatch || KOR || align=right | 1.2 km || 
|-id=978 bgcolor=#E9E9E9
| 318978 ||  || — || October 29, 2005 || Catalina || CSS || EUN || align=right | 2.1 km || 
|-id=979 bgcolor=#E9E9E9
| 318979 ||  || — || October 27, 2005 || Kitt Peak || Spacewatch || XIZ || align=right | 1.3 km || 
|-id=980 bgcolor=#d6d6d6
| 318980 ||  || — || October 27, 2005 || Mount Lemmon || Mount Lemmon Survey || KOR || align=right | 1.5 km || 
|-id=981 bgcolor=#E9E9E9
| 318981 ||  || — || October 29, 2005 || Mount Lemmon || Mount Lemmon Survey || — || align=right | 1.7 km || 
|-id=982 bgcolor=#d6d6d6
| 318982 ||  || — || October 31, 2005 || Kitt Peak || Spacewatch || SAN || align=right | 1.5 km || 
|-id=983 bgcolor=#d6d6d6
| 318983 ||  || — || October 29, 2005 || Mount Lemmon || Mount Lemmon Survey || ANF || align=right | 1.5 km || 
|-id=984 bgcolor=#fefefe
| 318984 ||  || — || October 29, 2005 || Catalina || CSS || — || align=right data-sort-value="0.81" | 810 m || 
|-id=985 bgcolor=#E9E9E9
| 318985 ||  || — || October 29, 2005 || Catalina || CSS || EUN || align=right | 2.4 km || 
|-id=986 bgcolor=#E9E9E9
| 318986 ||  || — || October 27, 2005 || Kitt Peak || Spacewatch || GEF || align=right | 1.5 km || 
|-id=987 bgcolor=#E9E9E9
| 318987 ||  || — || October 27, 2005 || Kitt Peak || Spacewatch || — || align=right | 1.1 km || 
|-id=988 bgcolor=#d6d6d6
| 318988 ||  || — || October 28, 2005 || Mount Lemmon || Mount Lemmon Survey || KOR || align=right | 1.3 km || 
|-id=989 bgcolor=#d6d6d6
| 318989 ||  || — || October 2, 2005 || Mount Lemmon || Mount Lemmon Survey || KAR || align=right | 1.1 km || 
|-id=990 bgcolor=#d6d6d6
| 318990 ||  || — || October 26, 2005 || Kitt Peak || Spacewatch || — || align=right | 3.0 km || 
|-id=991 bgcolor=#E9E9E9
| 318991 ||  || — || October 29, 2005 || Mount Lemmon || Mount Lemmon Survey || — || align=right | 1.9 km || 
|-id=992 bgcolor=#E9E9E9
| 318992 ||  || — || October 30, 2005 || Mount Lemmon || Mount Lemmon Survey || — || align=right | 1.9 km || 
|-id=993 bgcolor=#E9E9E9
| 318993 ||  || — || October 25, 2005 || Mount Lemmon || Mount Lemmon Survey || HOF || align=right | 3.2 km || 
|-id=994 bgcolor=#fefefe
| 318994 ||  || — || October 30, 2005 || Catalina || CSS || NYS || align=right data-sort-value="0.70" | 700 m || 
|-id=995 bgcolor=#E9E9E9
| 318995 ||  || — || October 25, 2005 || Kitt Peak || Spacewatch || WIT || align=right | 1.4 km || 
|-id=996 bgcolor=#fefefe
| 318996 ||  || — || October 25, 2005 || Kitt Peak || Spacewatch || FLO || align=right | 1.1 km || 
|-id=997 bgcolor=#d6d6d6
| 318997 ||  || — || October 25, 2005 || Kitt Peak || Spacewatch || — || align=right | 2.4 km || 
|-id=998 bgcolor=#E9E9E9
| 318998 ||  || — || October 25, 2005 || Kitt Peak || Spacewatch || WIT || align=right | 1.4 km || 
|-id=999 bgcolor=#d6d6d6
| 318999 ||  || — || October 26, 2005 || Kitt Peak || Spacewatch || — || align=right | 2.1 km || 
|-id=000 bgcolor=#d6d6d6
| 319000 ||  || — || October 28, 2005 || Kitt Peak || Spacewatch || KOR || align=right | 1.3 km || 
|}

References

External links 
 Discovery Circumstances: Numbered Minor Planets (315001)–(320000) (IAU Minor Planet Center)

0318